= United States Navy SEALs =

U.S. Navy's special operations force

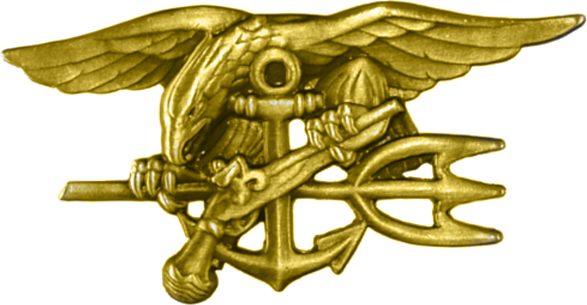
- Special Warfare insignia known as the "SEAL Trident"
- Founded: 1 January 1962 (64 years, 10 months)
- Country: United States
- Branch: United States Navy
- Type: Special operations force
- Role: Special operations; Direct action; Counter-terrorism; Special reconnaissance; Amphibious reconnaissance; Unconventional warfare; Hostage rescue; Foreign internal defense; Counter-proliferation; Counter narcotic operations; Underwater demolition
- Part of: U.S. Naval Special Warfare Command; Joint Special Operations Command • Naval Special Warfare Development Group (DEVGRU)
- Garrison/HQ: Dam Neck Annex NAS Oceana Naval Amphibious Base Coronado; Joint Expeditionary Base–Little Creek
- Nickname: The Men with Green Faces
- Motto: The Only Easy Day Was Yesterday
- Engagements: Vietnam War; Multinational Force in Lebanon; Operation Urgent Fury; Achille Lauro hijacking; Operation Earnest Will; Operation Prime Chance; Operation Snowcap; Operation Just Cause; Operation Nifty Package; Operation Desert Storm; Somali Civil War; Operation Restore Hope; Operation Gothic Serpent; Battle of Mogadishu; Operation Uphold Democracy; Yugoslav Wars; Operation Enduring Freedom; War in Afghanistan; Operation Red Wings; Operation Iraqi Freedom; Battle of Al Faw; Battle of Umm Qasr; Battle of Ramadi; War in North-West Pakistan; Angur Ada raid; Operation Neptune Spear; Maersk Alabama hijacking; 2013 raid on Barawe; War on ISIL; Operation Inherent Resolve; 2014 hostage rescue operations in Yemen; 2017 Marawi Crisis; Red Sea crisis; Operation Prosperity Guardian

The United States Navy Sea, Air, and Land (SEAL) Teams, commonly known as Navy SEALs, are the United States Navy's primary special operations force and a component of the United States Naval Special Warfare Command. Among the SEAL's main functions are conducting small-unit special operation missions in maritime, jungle, urban, arctic, mountainous, and desert environments. SEALs are typically ordered to capture or kill high-level targets, or to gather intelligence behind enemy lines.

SEAL team personnel are rigorously selected, highly trained, and proficient in unconventional warfare (UW), direct action (DA), and special reconnaissance (SR), among other tasks like sabotage, demolition, intelligence gathering, and hydrographic reconnaissance, training, and advising friendly militaries or other forces. All active SEALs are members of the U.S. Navy.

== History ==
=== Origins ===
Although not formally founded until 1962, the modern-day U.S. Navy SEALs trace their roots to World War II. The United States military recognized the need for the covert reconnaissance of landing beaches and coastal defenses. As a result, the joint Army, Marine Corps, and Navy Seabees Amphibious Scout and Raider School was established in 1942 at Fort Pierce, Florida. The Scouts and Raiders were formed in September of that year, just nine months after the attack on Pearl Harbor, from the Observer Group, a joint U.S. Army-Marine-Navy unit.

=== Scouts and Raiders ===
Recognizing the need for a beach reconnaissance force, a select group of Army and Navy personnel assembled at Amphibious Training Base (ATB) Little Creek, Virginia on 15 August 1942 to begin Amphibious Scouts and Raiders (Joint) training. The Scouts and Raiders' mission was to identify and reconnoiter the objective beach, maintain a position on the designated beach prior to a landing, and guide the assault waves to the landing beach. The unit was led by U.S. Army 1st Lieutenant Lloyd Peddicord as commanding officer, and Navy Ensign John Bell as executive officer. Navy Chief Petty Officers and sailors came from the boat pool at U. S. Naval Amphibious Training Base, Solomons, Maryland, and Army Raider personnel came from the 3rd and 9th Infantry Divisions. They trained at Little Creek until embarking for the North Africa campaign the following November. Operation Torch was launched in November 1942 off the Atlantic coast of French Morocco in North Africa.

The first group included Phil H. Bucklew, the "Father of Naval Special Warfare," after whom the Naval Special Warfare Center building is named. Commissioned in October 1942, this group saw combat in November 1942 during Operation Torch on the North African Coast. Scouts and Raiders also supported landings in Sicily, Salerno, Anzio, Normandy, and southern France.

The second group of Scouts and Raiders, code-named Special Service Unit No. 1, was established on 7 July 1943, as a joint and combined operations force. The first mission, in September 1943, was at Finschhafen in Papua New Guinea. Later operations were at Gasmata, Arawe, Cape Gloucester, and the east and south coasts of New Britain, all without any loss of personnel. Conflicts arose over operational matters, and all non-Navy personnel were reassigned. The unit, renamed 7th Amphibious Scouts, received a new mission, to go ashore with the assault boats, buoy channels, erect markers for the incoming craft, handle casualties, take offshore soundings, clear beach obstacles, and maintain voice communications linking the troops ashore, incoming boats and nearby ships. The 7th Amphibious Scouts conducted operations in the Pacific for the duration of the conflict, participating in more than 40 landings.

The third and final Scouts and Raiders organization operated in China. Scouts and Raiders were deployed to fight with the Sino-American Cooperative Organization (SACO). To help bolster the work of SACO, Admiral Ernest J. King ordered that 120 officers and 900 men be trained for "Amphibious Raider" at the Scout and Raider school at Fort Pierce, Florida. They formed the core of what was envisioned as a "guerrilla amphibious organization of Americans and Chinese operating from coastal waters, lakes, and rivers employing small steamboats and sampans." While most Amphibious Raider forces remained at Camp Knox in Calcutta, three of the groups saw active service. They conducted a survey of the upper Yangtze River in the spring of 1945 and, disguised as coolies, conducted a detailed three-month survey of the Chinese coast from Shanghai to Kitchioh Wan, near Hong Kong.

=== Naval Combat Demolition Units (NCDUs) ===
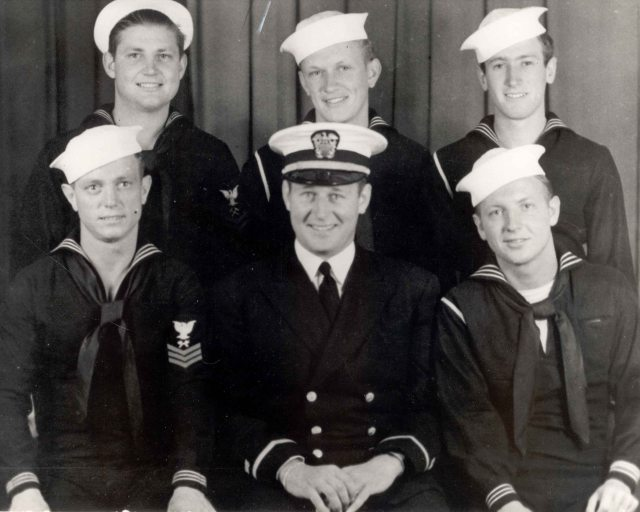
NCDU 45, CEC Ensign Karnowski, Chief Carpenters Mate Conrad C. Millis, MM2 Equipment Operator Lester Meyers, and three sailors. The unit received a Presidential Unit Citation with ENS Karnowski earning the Navy Cross & French Croix de Guerre with Palm, while MM2 Meyers received a Silver Star.

In September 1942, 17 Navy salvage personnel arrived at ATB Little Creek, Virginia for a week-long course in demolitions, explosive cable cutting, and commando raiding techniques. On 10 November 1942, the first combat demolition unit successfully cut cable and net barriers across the Wadi Sebou River during Operation Torch in North Africa. This enabled USS Dallas (DD-199) to traverse the water and insert U.S. Rangers who captured the Port Lyautey airdrome.

In early May 1943, a two-phase "Naval Demolition Project" was directed by the Chief of Naval Operations "to meet a present and urgent requirement". The first phase began at ATB Solomons, Maryland with the establishment of Operational Naval Demolition Unit No. 1. Six officers and eighteen enlisted men reported from the Seabee's NTC Camp Peary dynamiting and demolition school, for a four-week course. Those Seabees, led by Lieutenant Fred Wise CEC, were immediately sent to participate in the invasion of Sicily. At that time Lieutenant Commander Draper L. Kauffman, "The Father of Naval Combat Demolition," was selected to set up a school for Naval Demolitions and direct the entire Project. The first six classes graduated from "Area E" at NTC Camp Peary. LCDR Kauffman's needs quickly out-grew "Area E" and on 6 June 1943, he established NCDU training at Fort Pierce. Most of Kauffman's volunteers came from the navy's Civil Engineer Corps (CEC) and enlisted Seabees. Training commenced with a grueling week designed to filter out under-performing candidates. Eventually given the name "Hell Week" by NCDU recruits, this rigorous course was integrated into UDT training and remains a part of modern-day Navy Seal training today.

By April 1944, a total of 34 NCDUs were deployed to England in preparation for Operation Overlord, the amphibious landing at Normandy. On 6 June 1944, under heavy fire, the NCDUs at Omaha Beach managed to blow eight complete gaps and two partial gaps in the German defenses. The NCDUs suffered 31 killed and 60 wounded, a casualty rate of 52%. Meanwhile, the NCDUs at Utah Beach met less intense enemy fire. They cleared 700 yards (640 metres) of beach in two hours, another 900 yards (820 metres) by the afternoon. Casualties at Utah Beach were significantly lighter with six killed and eleven wounded. During Operation Overlord, not a single demolitioneer was lost to improper handling of explosives. In August 1944, four NCDUs from Utah Beach plus nine others participated in the landings Operation Dragoon in southern France. It was the last amphibious operation in the European Theater of Operations. Once the European invasions were complete, Rear Admiral Kelly Turner requisitioned all available NCDUs from Fort Pierce for integration into the Underwater Demolition Teams (UDTs) operating in the Pacific Theater.

Thirty NCDUs had been sent to the Pacific prior to Normandy. NCDUs 1–10 were staged on Florida Island in the Solomon Islands (archipelago) during January 1944. NCDU 1 went briefly to the Aleutians in 1943. NCDUs 4 and 5 were the first to see combat by helping the 4th Marines at Green Island and Emirau Island. A few were temporarily attached to UDTs. Later NCDUs 1–10 were combined to form Underwater Demolition Team Able. Six NCDUs: 2,3, 19, 20, 21 and 24 served with the Seventh Amphibious Force and were the only remaining NCDUs at the end of the war. The Naval Special Warfare Command building is named for LTJG Frank Kaine CEC commander of NCDU 2.

=== Underwater Demolition Teams (UDTs) ===
The first units designated as Underwater Demolition Teams were formed in the Pacific Theater. Rear Admiral Kelly Turner, the Navy's top amphibious expert, ordered the formation of Underwater Demolition Teams in response to the difficult invasion at Tarawa and the Marines' inability to clear the surrounding coral reefs with Landing Vehicle Tracked (LVTS). Turner recognized that amphibious operations required intelligence of underwater obstacles. The personnel for these teams were mostly local Seabees or others that had started out in the NCDUs. UDT training was at the Waipio Amphibious Operating Base, under V Amphibious Corps operational and administrative control. Most of the instructors and trainees were graduates of the Fort Pierce NCDU or Scouts and Raiders schools, Seabees, Marines, and Army soldiers.

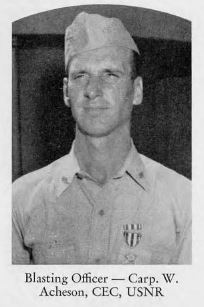
Carp. W. H. Acheson Silver Star ceremony for UDT 1 action at Engibi where he stripped down to swim trunks and did reconnaissance in broad daylight on a hostile beach becoming a role model of UDTs being swimmers.

When Teams 1 and 2 were initially formed, they were "provisional" with 180 men in total. The first underwater demolition team commanders were CDR E.D. Brewster (CEC) UDT 1 and CDR John T. Koehler UDT 2. The teams wore fatigues with life-vests and were not expected to leave their boats—similar to the NCDUs. However, at Kwajalein Fort Pierce protocol was changed. Admiral Turner ordered daylight reconnaissance and CEC. ENS Lewis F. Luehrs and Seabee Chief William Acheson wore swim trunks under their fatigues anticipating they would not be able to get what the Admiral wanted by staying in the boat. They stripped down and spent 45 minutes in the water in broad daylight. When they got out they were taken directly to Admiral Turner's flagship to report, still in their trunks. Admiral Turner concluded that daylight reconnaissance by individual swimmers was the way to get accurate information on coral and underwater obstacles for upcoming landings. This is what he reported to Admiral Nimitz. The success of those UDT 1 Seabees not following Fort Pierce protocol rewrote the UDT mission model and training regimen. Those Seabees also created the image of UDTs as the "naked warriors". At Engebi CDR Brewster was wounded and all of the men with ENS Luehrs wore swim trunks under their greens.

After the operations in the Marshall Islands, Admiral Turner restructured the two provisional UDT units and created 7 permanent units with an allotted size of 96 men per team. In the name of operational efficiency, the UDTs were also made an-all Navy outfit, and any Army and Marine Corps engineers were returned to their units. Moving forward, the UDTs would employ the reconnaissance method made successful in Kwajalein – daytime use of swimsuits and goggles instead of the Scouts and Raiders method of nighttime rubber boats. In order to implement these changes and grow the UDTs, Koehler was made the commanding officer of the Naval Combat Demolition Training and Experimental Base on Maui. Admiral Turner also brought on LCDR Draper Kauffman as a combat officer.

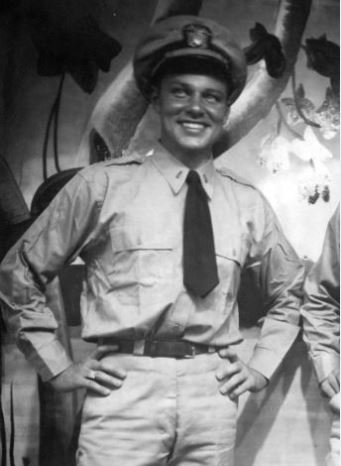
Lt. Luehrs was one of the 30 officers from the 7th NCR that staged for UDTs 1 & 2. He and Chief Acheson were the first UDT swimmers. His Corps insignia would have had a Seabee on it.

Seabees made up the vast majority of the men in teams 1–9, 13, and 15. Seabees were roughly 20% of UDT 11. The officers were mostly CEC. At war's end 34 teams had been formed with teams 1–21 having actually been deployed. The Seabees provided over half of the men in the teams that saw service.

The UDT uniform had transitioned from the combat fatigues of the NCDUs to trunks, swimfins, diving masks and Ka-bars. The men trained by the OSS had brought their swimfins with them when they joined the UDTs. They were adopted by the other teams as quickly as Supply could get them.

These "Naked Warriors", as they came to be called post-war, saw action in every major Pacific amphibious landing including: Eniwetok, Saipan, Kwajalein, Tinian, Guam, Angaur, Ulithi, Peleliu, Leyte, Lingayen Gulf, Zambales, Iwo Jima, Okinawa, Labuan, and Brunei Bay. By fall of 1944, the UDT's were considered an indispensable US military special operations unit, and Navy planners in the Central Pacific relied heavily on the UDT's reconnaissance reports and demolition activities to clear the way for landings.

The last UDT operation of the war was on 4 July 1945 at Balikpapan, Borneo. The rapid demobilization at the conclusion of the war reduced the number of active duty UDTs to two on each coast with a complement of seven officers and 45 enlisted men each. However, the UDTs were the only special troops that avoided complete disbandment after the war, unlike the OSS Maritime Unit, the VAC Recon Battalion, and several Marine recon missions.

Because they were so integral to the success of missions in the Pacific during the war, the U.S. Navy did not publicize the existence of the UDTs until post-war. During WWII the Navy did not have a rating for the UDTs nor did they have an insignia. Those men with the CB rating on their uniforms considered themselves Seabees that were doing underwater demolition (Fig. 11). They did not call themselves "UDTs" or "Frogmen" but rather "Demolitioneers" which had carried over from the NCDUs and Lt Cdr Kauffman's recruiting efforts from the Seabee dynamiting and demolition school. The next largest group of UDT volunteers came from the joint Army-Navy Scouts and Raiders school that was also in Fort Pierce and the Navy's bomb disposal school in the Seabee-dominated teams.

For the Marianas operations of Kwajalein, Roi-Namur, Siapan, Tinian, Eniwetok, and Guam, Admiral Turner recommended sixty Silver Stars and over three hundred Bronze Stars with Vs for the Seabees and other service members of UDTs 1–7 That was unprecedented in U.S. Naval/Marine Corps history. For UDTs 5 and 7 every officer received a silver star and all the enlisted received bronze stars with Vs for Operation Forager (Tinian). For UDTs 3 and 4 every officer received a silver star and all the enlisted received bronze stars with Vs for Operation Forager (Guam). Admiral Richard Lansing Conolly felt the commanders of teams 3 and 4 (LT Crist and LT W.G. Carberry) should have received Navy Crosses.

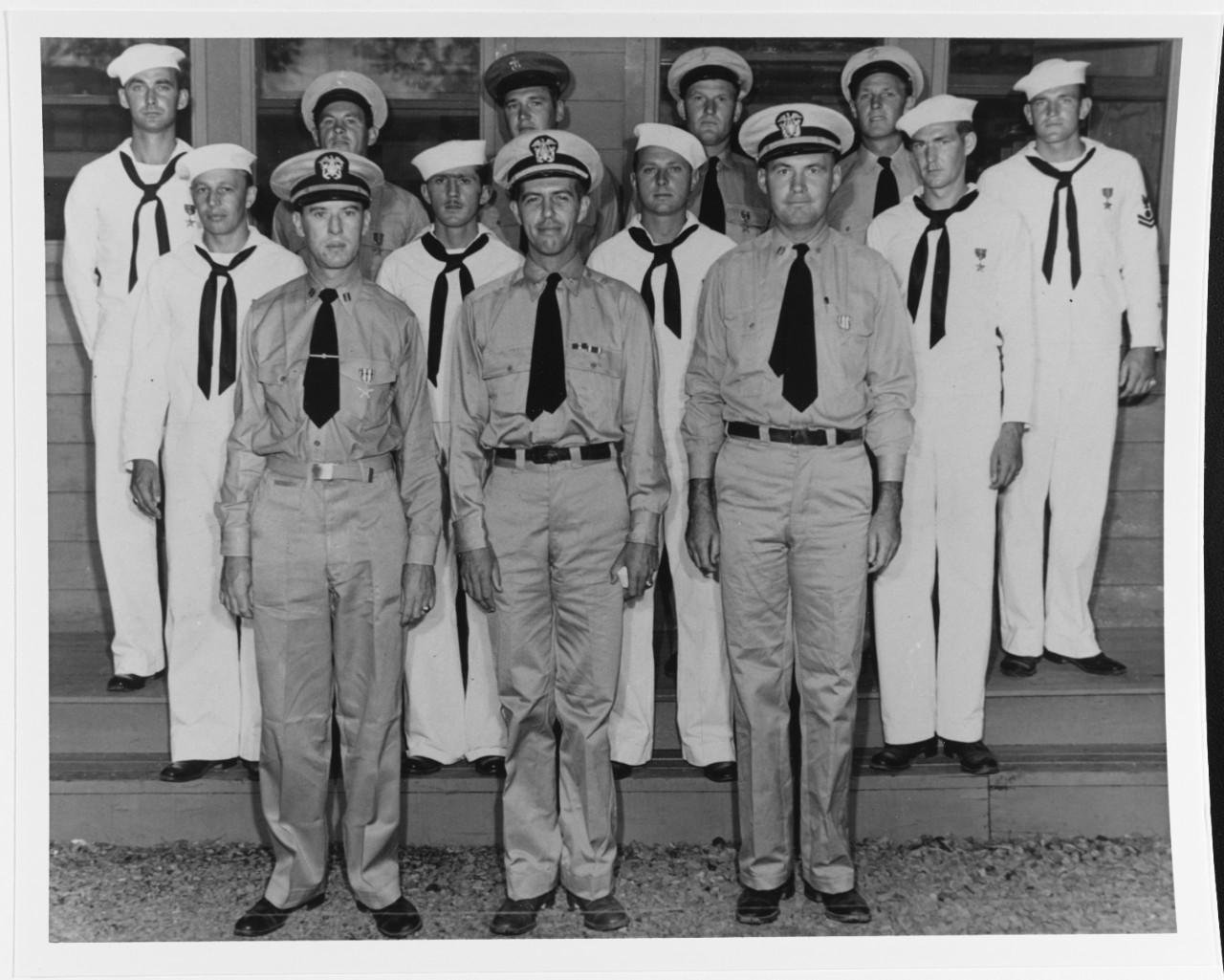
LT Crist (CEC), LCDR Kauffman, and LT Carberry right–left at the UDT Silver and Bronze Stars award ceremony.

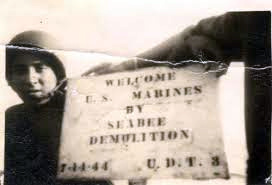
Seabees in both UDT 3 and 4 made signs to greet the Marines assaulting Guam. However, Team 4 was able to leave theirs on the beach for the Marines to see that the Seabees had been there first. UDT 4 posted this sign again on the Hotel Marquee for its 25-year reunion.

As the first to often make amphibious landings, the UDTs began making signs to welcome the Marines, indicating they had been there first, to foster the continued friendly rivalry. In keeping with UDT tradition, UDT 21 created a sign to greet the Marines landing in Japan. For Operation Beleaguer UDT 9 was deployed with the III Amphibious Corps to Northern China. In 1965 the UDT 12 put up another beach sign to greet the Marines at Da Nang.

Operation Crossroads UDT 3 was designated TU 1.1.3 for the operation. On 27 April 1946, seven officers and 51 enlisted embarked at CBC Port Hueneme, for transit to Bikini. Their assignment was to retrieve water samples from ground zero of the Baker blast.

=== Korean War ===
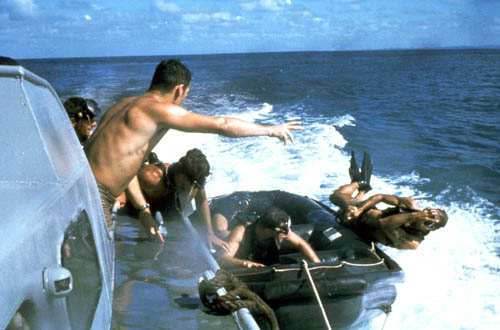
UDT members using the casting technique from a speeding boat

The Korean War began on 25 June 1950, when the North Korean army invaded South Korea. Beginning with a detachment of 11 personnel from UDT 3, UDT participation expanded to three teams with a combined strength of 300 men. During the "Forgotten War" the UDTs fought intensely, employing demolition expertise gained from World War II and using it for an offensive role. Continuing to use water as cover and concealment as well as an insertion method, the Korean Era UDTs targeted bridges, tunnels, fishing nets, and other maritime and coastal targets. They also developed a close working relationship with the Republic of Korea Underwater Demolitions Unit (predecessor to the Navy Special Warfare Flotilla), which continues today.

Through their focused efforts on demolitions and mine disposal, the UDTs refined and developed their commando tactics during the Korean War. The UDTs also accompanied South Korean commandos on raids in the North to demolish train tunnels. This was frowned upon by higher-ranking officials because they believed it was a non-traditional use of Naval forces. Due to the nature of the war, the UDTs maintained a low operational profile. Some of the missions included transporting spies into North Korea and the destruction of North Korean fishing nets used to supply the North Korean Army.

As part of the Special Operations Group, or SOG, UDTs successfully conducted demolition raids on railroad tunnels and bridges along the Korean coast. The UDTs specialized in a somewhat new mission: Night coastal demolition raids against railroad tunnels and bridges. The UDT men were given the task because, in the words of UDT LT Ted Fielding, "We were ready to do what nobody else could do, and what nobody else wanted to do." (Ted Fielding was awarded the Silver Star during Korea, and was later promoted to the rank of Captain.)

On 15 September 1950, UDTs supported Operation Chromite, the amphibious landing at Incheon. UDT 1 and 3 provided personnel who went in ahead of the landing craft, scouting mud flats, marking low points in the channel, clearing fouled propellers, and searching for mines. Four UDT personnel acted as wave-guides for the Marine landing. In October 1950, UDTs supported mine-clearing operations in Wonsan Harbor where frogmen would locate and mark mines for minesweepers. On 12 October 1950, two U.S.minesweepers hit mines and sank. UDTs rescued 25 sailors. The next day, William Giannotti conducted the first U.S. combat operation using an "aqualung" when he dived on USS Pledge. For the remainder of the war, UDTs conducted beach and river reconnaissance, infiltrated guerrillas behind the lines from sea, continued mine sweeping operations and participated in Operation Fishnet, which devastated the North Koreans' fishing capability.

=== Birth of the Navy SEALs ===
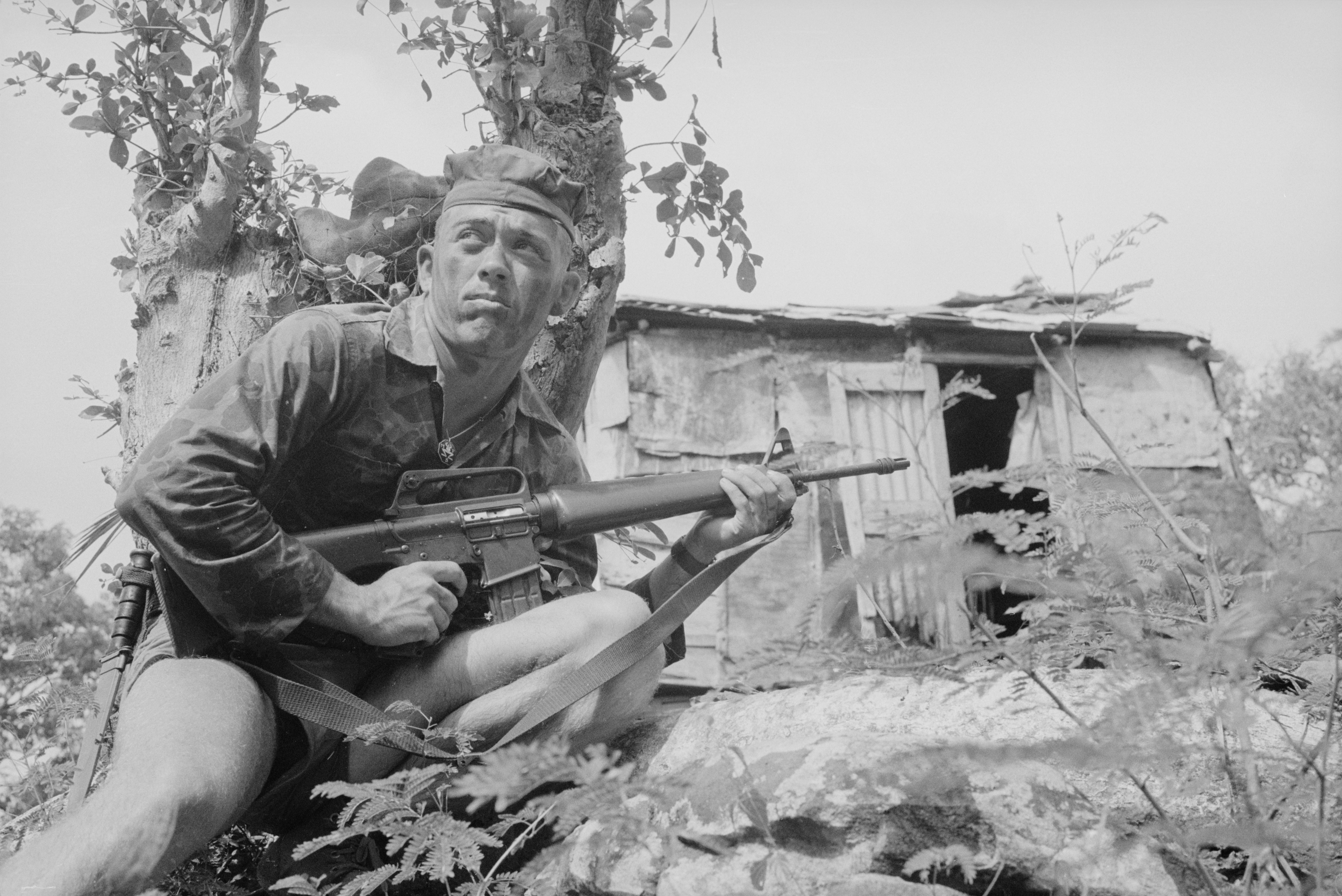
SEAL during a military exercise on St. Thomas, Virgin Islands in 1963

President John F. Kennedy, aware of the situation in Southeast Asia, recognized the need for unconventional warfare and special operations as a measure against guerrilla warfare. In a speech to Congress on 25 May 1961, Kennedy spoke of his deep respect for the United States Army Special Forces. While his announcement of the government's plan to put a man on the moon drew most of the attention, in the same speech he announced his intention to spend over $100 million to strengthen U.S. special operations forces and expand American capabilities in unconventional warfare. Some people erroneously credit President Kennedy with creating the Navy SEALs. His announcement was actually only a formal acknowledgement of a process that had been underway since the Korean War.

The Navy needed to determine its role within the special operations arena. In March 1961, Admiral Arleigh Burke, the Chief of Naval Operations, recommended the establishment of guerrilla and counter-guerrilla units. These units would be able to operate from sea, air or land. This was the beginning of the Navy SEALs. Per Chief of Naval Operations' direction to, "...establish special operations teams as a separate component within Underwater Demolition Units ONE and TWO...", the new SEAL Teams would be formed entirely of personnel transferred from Underwater Demolition Teams. UDTs, which had already gained extensive experience in commando warfare in Korea, would continue alongside the SEAL Teams until their redesignation in 1983.

The first two teams were formed in January 1962 and stationed on both US coasts: Team One at Naval Amphibious Base Coronado, in San Diego, California, and Team Two at Naval Amphibious Base Little Creek, in Virginia Beach, Virginia. The SEALs mission was to conduct counter guerilla warfare and clandestine operations in maritime and riverine environments. Men of the newly formed SEAL Teams were trained in such unconventional areas as hand-to-hand combat, high-altitude parachuting, demolitions, and foreign languages. The SEALs attended Underwater Demolition Team replacement training and they spent some time training in UDTs. Upon making it to a SEAL team, they would undergo a SEAL Basic Indoctrination (SBI) training class at Camp Kerry in the Cuyamaca Mountains. After SBI training class, they would enter a platoon and conduct platoon training. Frederick H. Kaiser, a veteran of both UDT-12 and SEAL Team ONE, wrote of his training in 1964:

“The training program for an officer lasts 21weeks and covered physical conditioning, swimming, diving with various types of underwater breathing apparatus, reconnaissance operations, the use of explosives, and a myriad of other topics that were key to enabling you to accomplish future missions, while protecting your life along with that of your comrades. Follow-on training included 3 weeks of parachute jump training at Fort Benning, Georgia, Survival school at Camp Pendelton in California, and an assortment of other programs to meet the needs of the teams. During UDT/SEAL training, the officers and enlisted personnel were treated as equals, no favoritism, no special privileges. If anything, the officers took the brunt of the abuse, for if they were to lead their men in the future, their men had to know they would lead by example, that the officer would and could do any task he assigned his men.”

According to founding SEAL team member Roy Boehm, the SEALs' first missions were directed against communist Cuba. These consisted of deploying from submarines and carrying out beach reconnaissance in a prelude to a proposed US amphibious invasion of the island. On at least one occasion, Boehm and another SEAL had smuggled a CIA agent ashore to take pictures of Soviet nuclear missiles being unloaded on the dockside.

=== Vietnam War ===
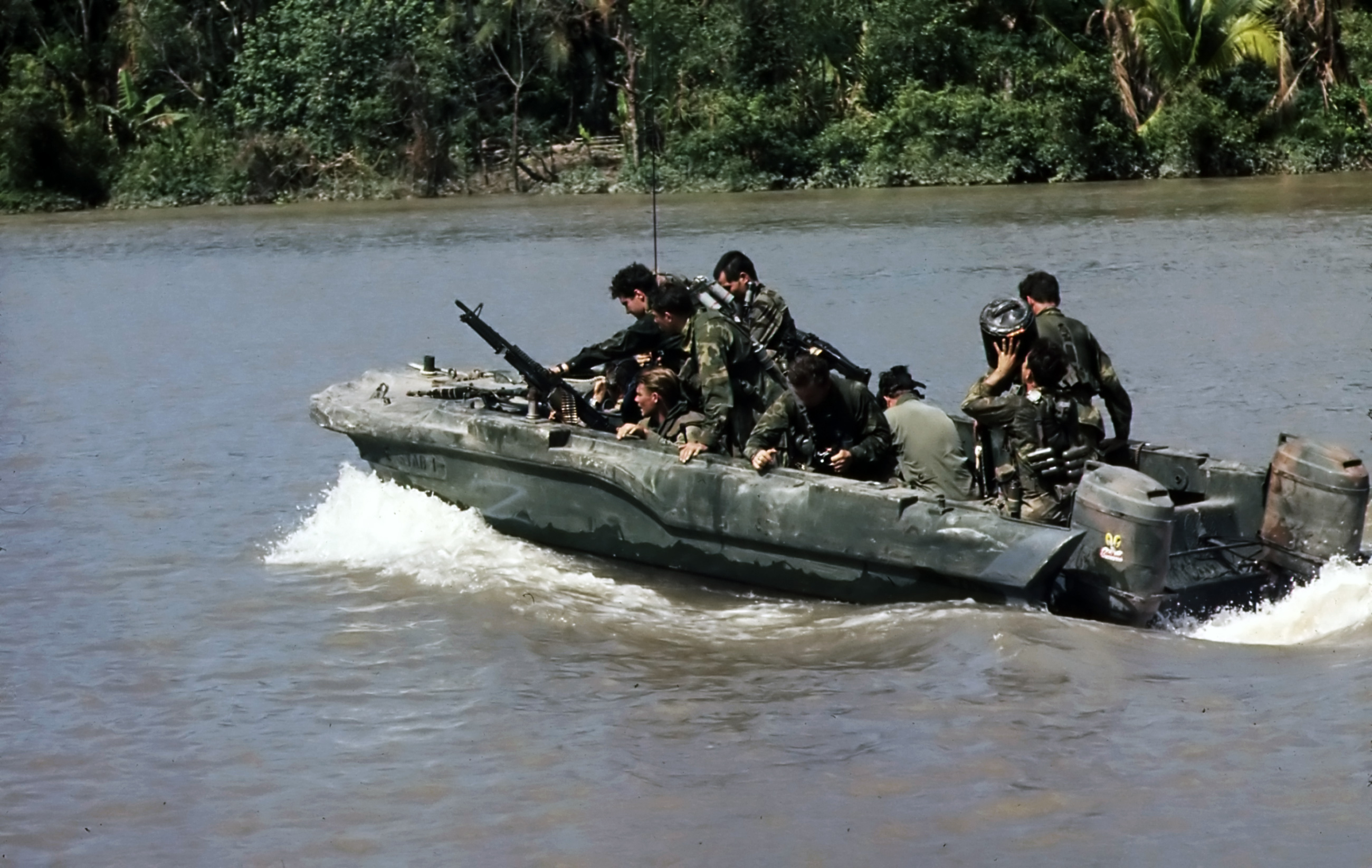
SEALs on patrol in the Mekong Delta in 1967

Navy SEAL team boards a Light SEAL Support Craft in 1968

The Pacific Command recognized Vietnam as a potential hot spot for unconventional forces. At the beginning of 1962, the UDTs started hydrographic surveys and along with other branches of the US Military, the Military Assistance Command Vietnam (MACV) was formed. In March 1962, SEALs were deployed to South Vietnam as advisors for the purpose of training Army of the Republic of Vietnam commandos in the same methods they were trained themselves.

The Central Intelligence Agency began using SEALs in covert operations in early 1963. The SEALs were later involved in the CIA sponsored Phoenix Program where it targeted Vietcong (VC) infrastructure and personnel for capture and assassination.

The SEALs were initially deployed in and around Da Nang, training the South Vietnamese in combat diving, demolitions and guerrilla/anti-guerrilla tactics. As the war continued, the SEALs found themselves positioned in the Rung Sat Special Zone where they were to disrupt the enemy supply and troop movements and in the Mekong Delta to fulfill riverine operations, fighting on the inland waterways.

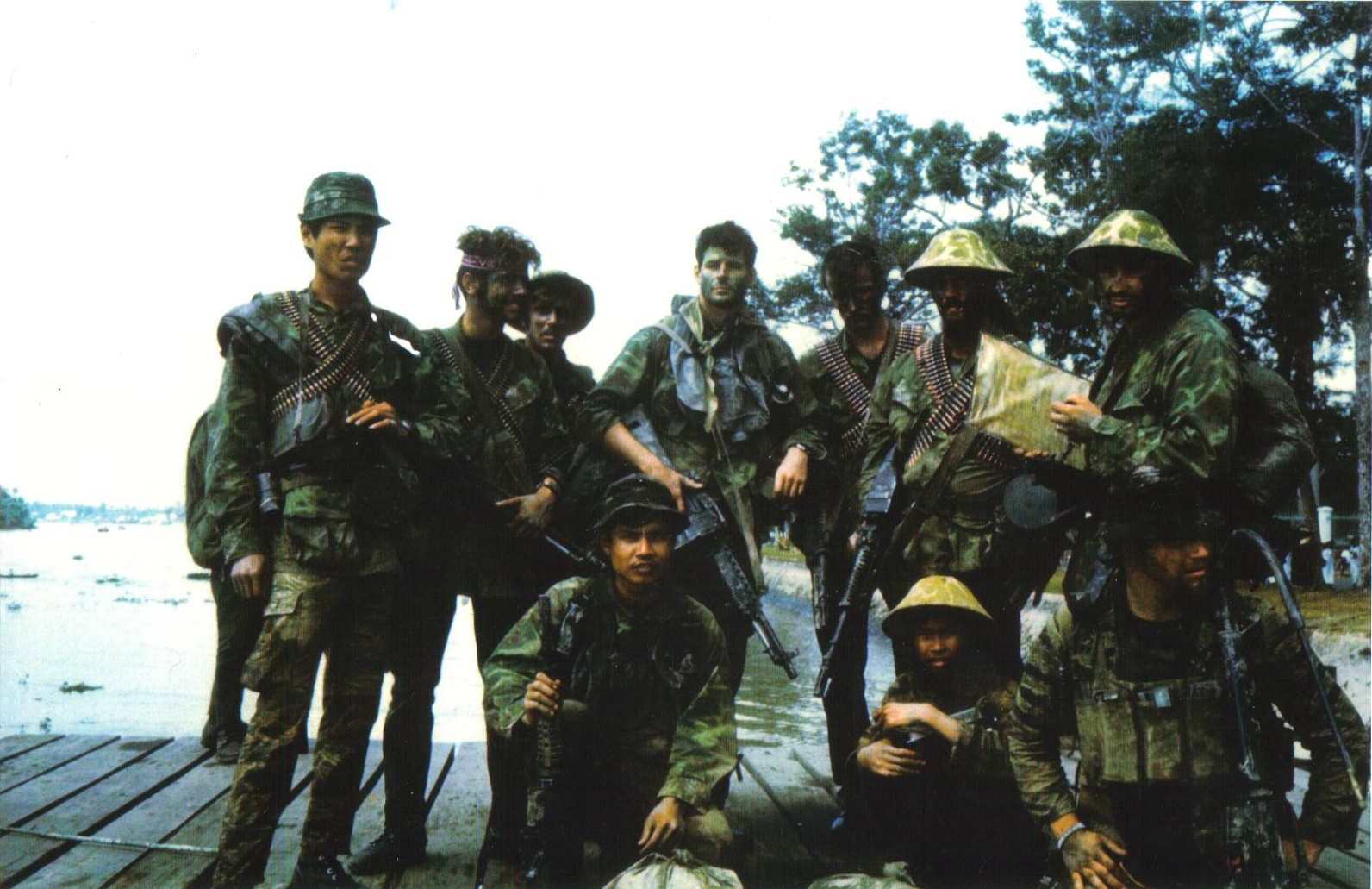
Navy SEALS X-Ray platoon in 1970

Combat with the VC was direct. Unlike the conventional warfare methods of firing artillery into a coordinate location, the SEALs operated close to their targets. Into the late 1960s, the SEALs were successful in a new style of warfare, effective in anti-guerrilla and guerrilla actions. SEALs brought a personal war to the enemy in a previously safe area. The VC referred to them as "the men with green faces," due to the camouflage face paint the SEALs wore during combat missions.

In February 1966, a small SEAL Team One detachment arrived in South Vietnam to conduct direct action missions. Operating from Nhà Bè Base, near the Rung Sat Special Zone, this detachment signalled the beginning of a SEAL presence that would eventually include 8 SEAL platoons in country on a continuing basis. SEALs also served as advisors for Provincial Reconnaissance Units and the Lein Doc Nguio Nhia, the Vietnamese SEALs.

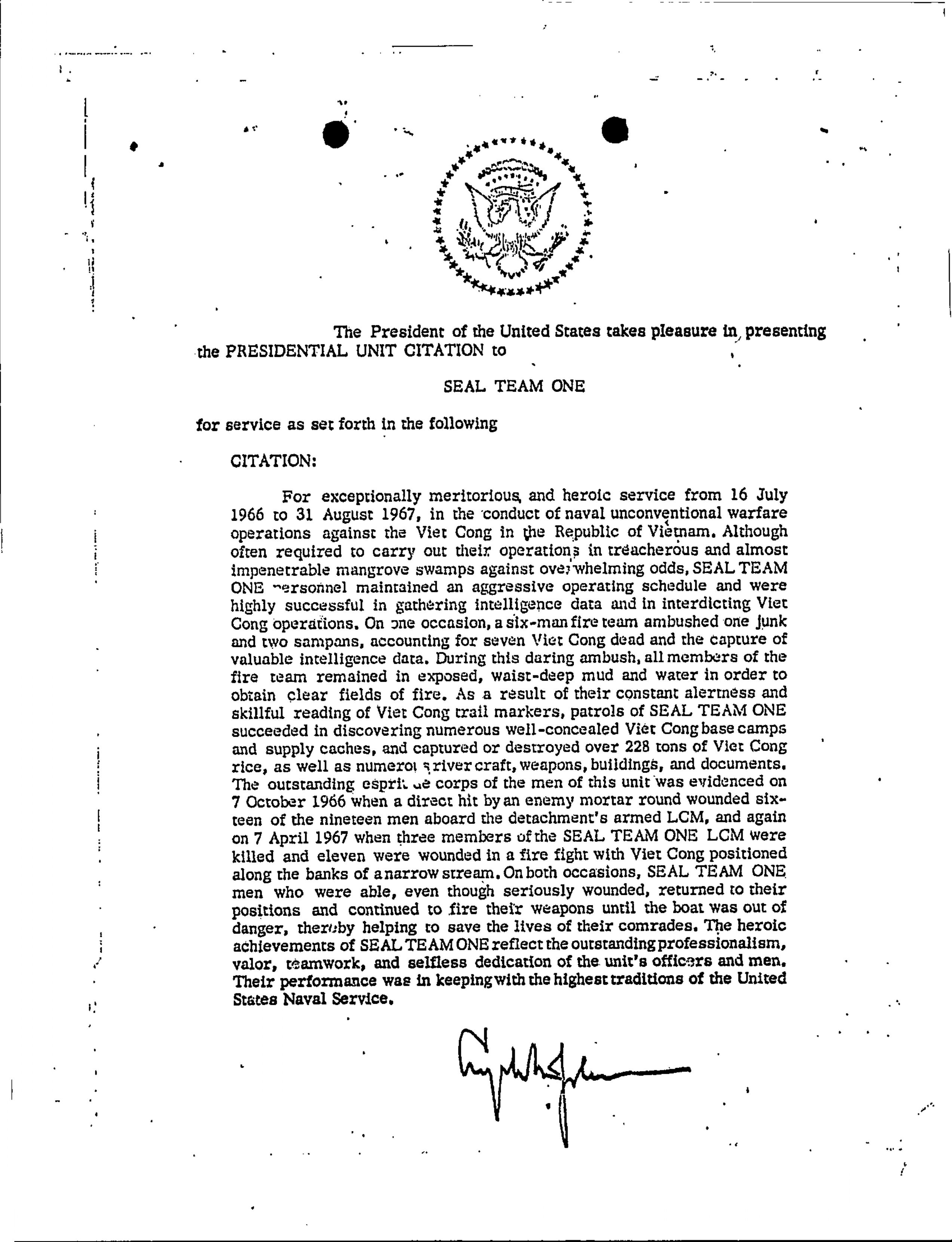
Presidential Unit Citation awarded by President Johnson to SEAL Team ONE for extraordinary heroism in Vietnam from July 1966 to August 1967

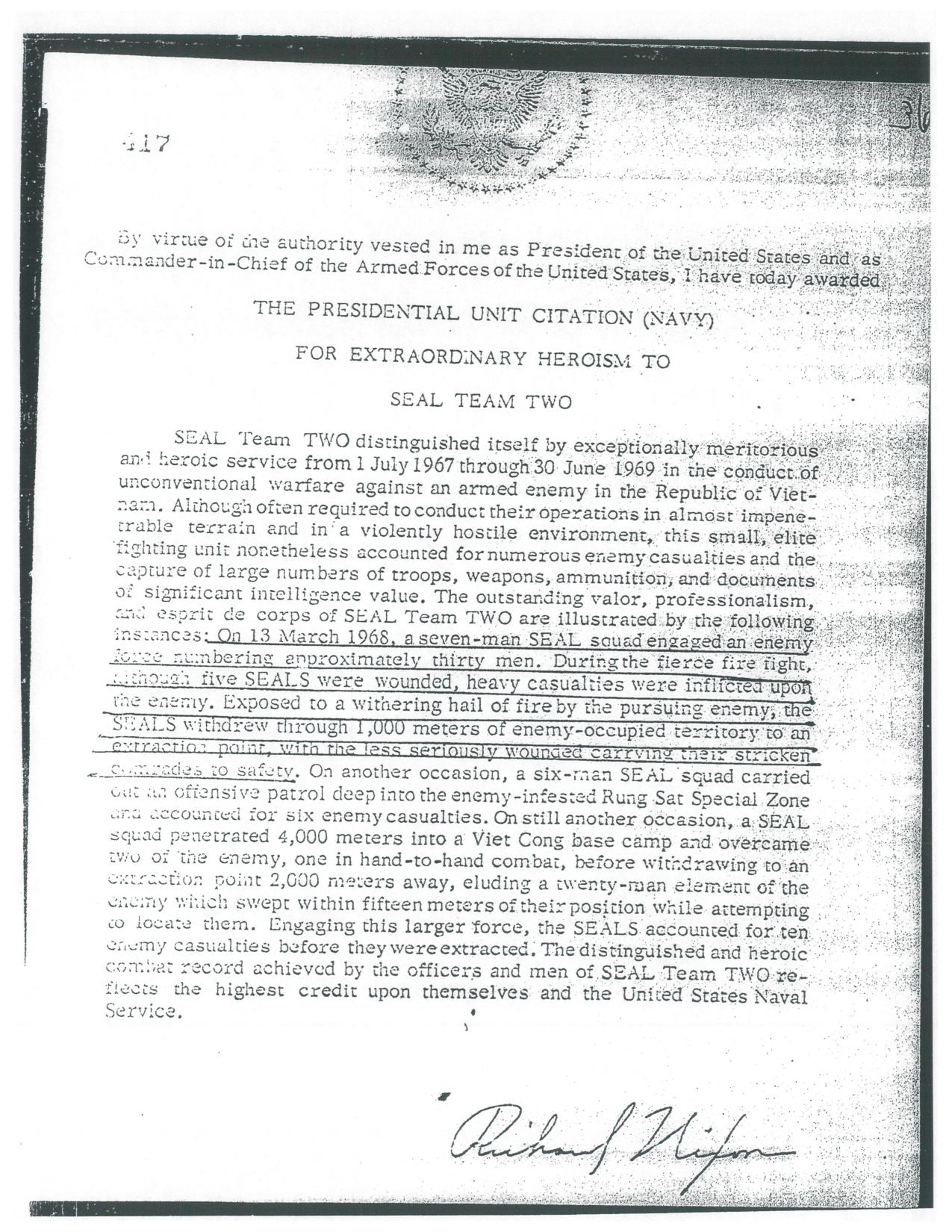
Presidential Unit Citation awarded to SEAL Team TWO for extraordinary heroism in Vietnam from July 1967 to June 1969

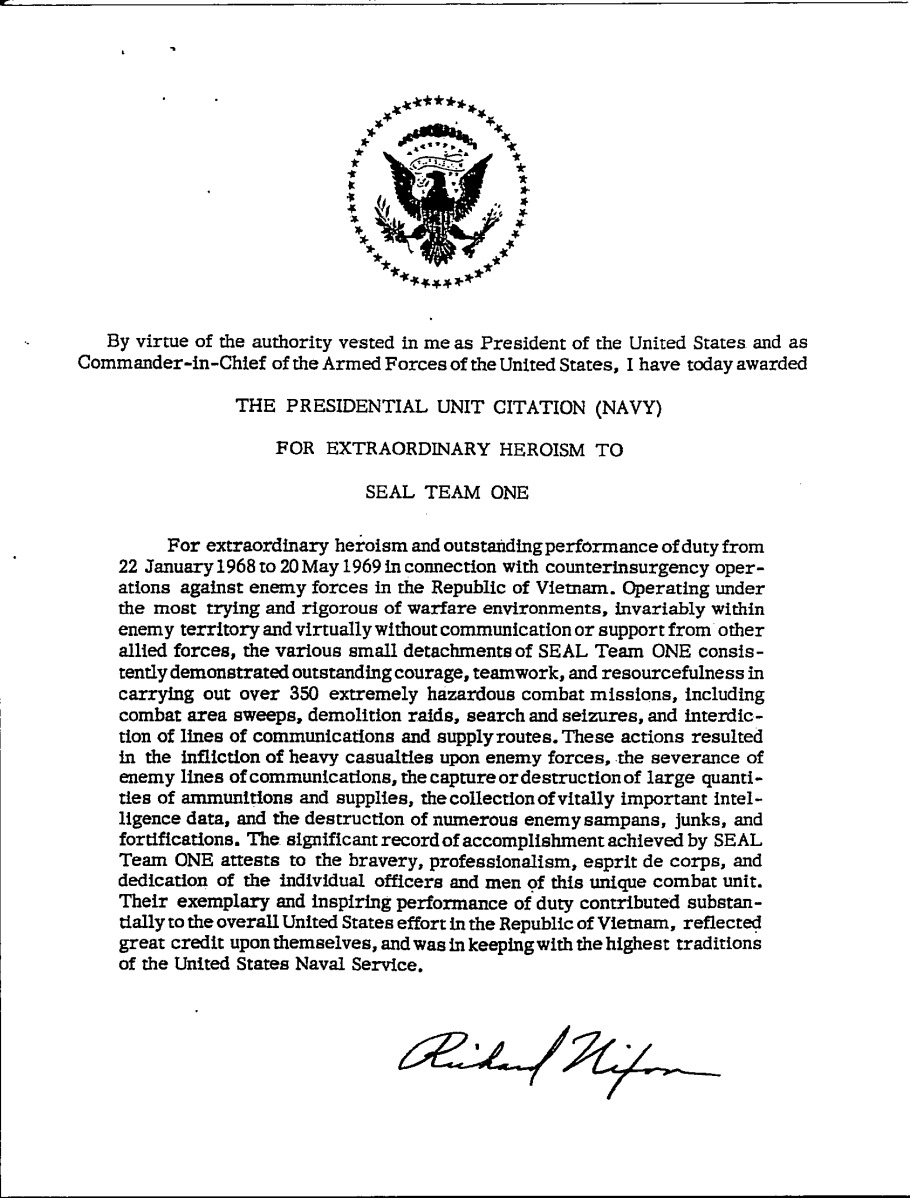
Presidential Unit Citation awarded by President Richard Nixon to SEAL Team ONE for extraordinary heroism in Vietnam from January 1968 to May 1969

SEALs continued to make forays into North Vietnam and Laos and covertly into Cambodia, controlled by the Studies and Observations Group. The SEALs from Team Two started a unique deployment of SEAL team members working alone with ARVN Commandos. In 1967, a SEAL unit named Detachment Bravo (Det Bravo) was formed to operate these mixed US and ARVN units.

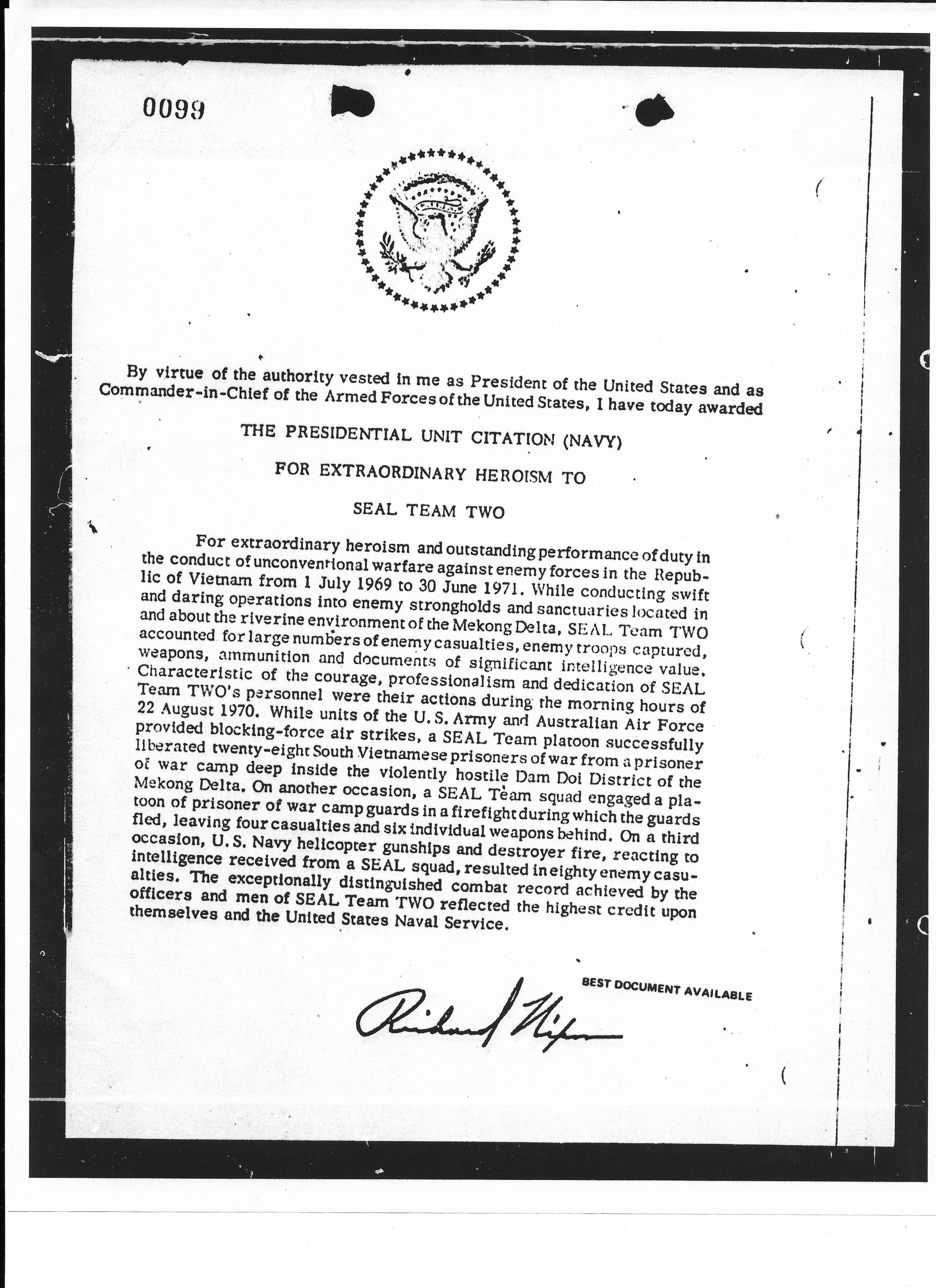
Presidential Unit Citation awarded to SEAL Team TWO for extraordinary heroism in Vietnam from July 1969 to June 1971

By 1970, President Richard Nixon initiated a plan of Vietnamization, which would remove the US from the Vietnam War and return the responsibility of defense back to the South Vietnamese. Conventional forces were being withdrawn; the last SEAL platoon left South Vietnam on 7 December 1971, and the last SEAL advisor left South Vietnam in March 1973. The SEALs were among the most highly decorated units for their size in the war, receiving by 1974 one Medal of Honor, two Navy Crosses, 42 Silver stars, 402 Bronze Stars, two Legions of Merit, 352 Commendation Medals, and 51 Navy Achievement Medals Later awards would bring the total to three Medals of Honor and five Navy Crosses. SEAL Team One was awarded three Presidential Unit Citations and one Navy Unit Commendation; SEAL Team Two received two Presidential Unit Citations. By the end of the war, 48 SEALs had been killed in Vietnam, but estimates of their kill count are as high as 2,000. The Navy SEAL Museum in Fort Pierce, Florida, displays a list of the 48 SEALs who lost their lives in combat during the Vietnam War.

=== Early administration and reorganization ===
From their founding in 1962 until 1968, SEAL Team members did not receive a distinct Navy Enlistment Classification (NEC) code. Instead, personnel attached to SEAL Team ONE or TWO were classified as 5321 Underwater Demolition Team Swimmers or 5322 Underwater Demolition Team/EOD Swimmers. In 1968, NEC 5326 Combatant Swimmer, SEAL Team and 5327 Combatant Swimmer, SEAL Team/EOD Technician were introduced. These classifications fell under component NEC 5321 (and 5322 for EOD), with 5326 and 5327 requiring the Army Airborne course (2E-F1/011-F1), receipt of the superseding component NEC, and six months on-the-job training with a SEAL Team to receive the secondary code.

In 1968, the first qualification insignia were approved for both Underwater Demolition Team and SEAL Team personnel. These insignia were the same, save for the SEAL insignia having an eagle perched atop the trident. In March 1972, both insignia were superseded with the Naval Special Warfare insignia, which adopted the SEAL design in its entirety. In August of that year, the silver enlisted insignia was replaced by a gold one, thus becoming the only gold insignia badge worn by both officer and enlisted personnel. By 1975, personnel awarded the defunct UDT badge could apply for the Special Warfare Insignia to replace the discontinued decoration. Per SEAL veteran and future Navy Commander Tim Bosiljevac:

By the early 1970s, since all frogmen were parachute qualified, the UDT and SEAL symbols were merged as one. The design which remained was the original SEAL design...The breast insignia could only be worn by those men who graduated from BUD/S and had additionally served a six month minimum probationary period within an active SEAL or UDT unit...The UDT/SEAL breast Insignia was too large and stood out too loudly, just like the men who wore it. Encountering such an attitude, frogmen wore it much more proudly.

On 1 May 1983, UDT–11 was redesignated as SEAL Team Five, UDT–21 was redesignated as SEAL Team Four, UDT–12 became SEAL Delivery Vehicle Team One (SDVT–1), and UDT–22 was redesignated as SDVT-2. SEAL Team Three, was established 1 October 1983 in Coronado, California. United States Special Operations Command (SOCOM) was established in April 1987 and its Naval component, United States Naval Special Warfare Command (NAVSPECWARCOM), also known as NSWC, was established at the same time.

Similar administrative changes continued through the 1990s and the 2000s. This is most apparent with the consolidation of Navy Enlistment Classification (NEC) codes. Over the years, various "combatant swimmer" NECs existed. This included the 5321 (UDT Swimmer), 5322 (UDT Swimmer/EOD Technician), 5323 (SEAL Delivery Vehicle Pilot/Navigator/DDS Operator), and 5326 (Combatant Swimmer, SEAL Team). By the 1990s, the Navy would start referring to these NECs using the umbrella 532X "Special Warfare Combatant Swimmer" code. In 2006, the designation process was again consolidated through the creation of the Special Warfare Operator (SO) rate. This rate would use the historic Underwater Demolition Team insignia design as its rate mark identifying all enlisted Navy SEALs.

Due to the 1962 formation of SEAL Team ONE and TWO from Underwater Demolition Team personnel, the shared BUD/S training pipeline, the unified "SEAL Trident" in 1972, the redesignation of Underwater Demolition Teams as SEAL Teams in 1983, the evolution of the 532x SEAL classification code, and through the adoption of the legacy UDT insignia heraldry as the Special Warfare Operator rate mark in 2006, UDT members are recognized as contemporary SEAL veterans. In 2017, Naval Special Warfare Group TWO extended this recognition to World War II Scouts and Raiders veterans when retired Petty Officer 1st Class, Bruce E. McCormick, was presented the Special Warfare (SEAL) insignia.

=== Grenada ===
Both SEAL Team Four and SEAL Team Six, the predecessor to DEVGRU, participated in the US invasion of Grenada. The SEALs' two primary missions were the extraction of Grenada's Governor-General, Sir Paul Scoon, and the capture of Grenada's only radio tower. Neither mission was well briefed or sufficiently supported with timely intelligence and the SEALs ran into trouble from the very beginning. On 24 October 1983, twelve operators from SEAL Team Six and four Air Force Combat Control Team members (CCT) conducted a predawn combat airborne water insertion from C-130 Hercules aircraft with Zodiac inflatable rubber boats 40 kilometers north of Point Salines, Grenada. The team inserted with full combat gear in bad weather with low visibility conditions and high winds. Four SEALs drowned and were never recovered. SEALs split into two teams and proceeded to their objectives. After digging in at the Governor's mansion, the SEALs realized they had forgotten to load their cryptographic satellite phone. As Grenadian and Cuban troops surrounded the team, the SEALs' only radio ran out of battery power, and they used the mansion's land line telephone to call in AC-130 gunship fire support. The SEALs were pinned down in the mansion overnight and were relieved and extracted by a group of Marines the following morning.

The team sent to the radio station also ran into communication problems. As soon as the SEALs reached the radio facility they found themselves unable to raise their command post. After beating back several waves of Grenadian and Cuban troops supported by BTR-60 armored personnel carriers, the SEALs decided that their position at the radio tower was untenable. They destroyed the station and fought their way to the water where they hid from patrolling enemy forces. After the enemy had given up their search, the SEALs, some wounded, swam into the open sea where they were extracted several hours later after being spotted by a reconnaissance aircraft.

=== Iran–Iraq War ===
During the closing stages of the Iran–Iraq War the United States Navy began conducting operations in the Persian Gulf to protect US-flagged ships from attack by Iranian naval forces. A secret plan was put in place and dubbed Operation Prime Chance. Navy SEAL Teams 1 and 2 along with several Special Boat Units and EOD technicians were deployed on mobile command barges and transported by helicopters from the Army's 160th Special Operations Aviation Regiment. Over the course of the operation SEALs conducted VBSS (visit, board, search, and seizure) missions to counter Iranian mine-laying boats. The only loss of life occurred during the takedown of the Iran Ajr. Evidence gathered on the Iran Ajr by the SEALs later allowed the US Navy to trace the mines that struck USS Samuel B. Roberts (FFG-58). This chain of events led to Operation Praying Mantis, the largest US Naval surface engagement since the Second World War.

During Operation Desert Shield and Storm, Navy SEALs trained Kuwaiti Special Forces. They set up naval special operations groups in Kuwait, working with the Kuwaiti Navy in exile. Using these new diving, swimming, and combat skills, these commandos took part in combat operations such as the liberation of the capital city.

=== Panama ===
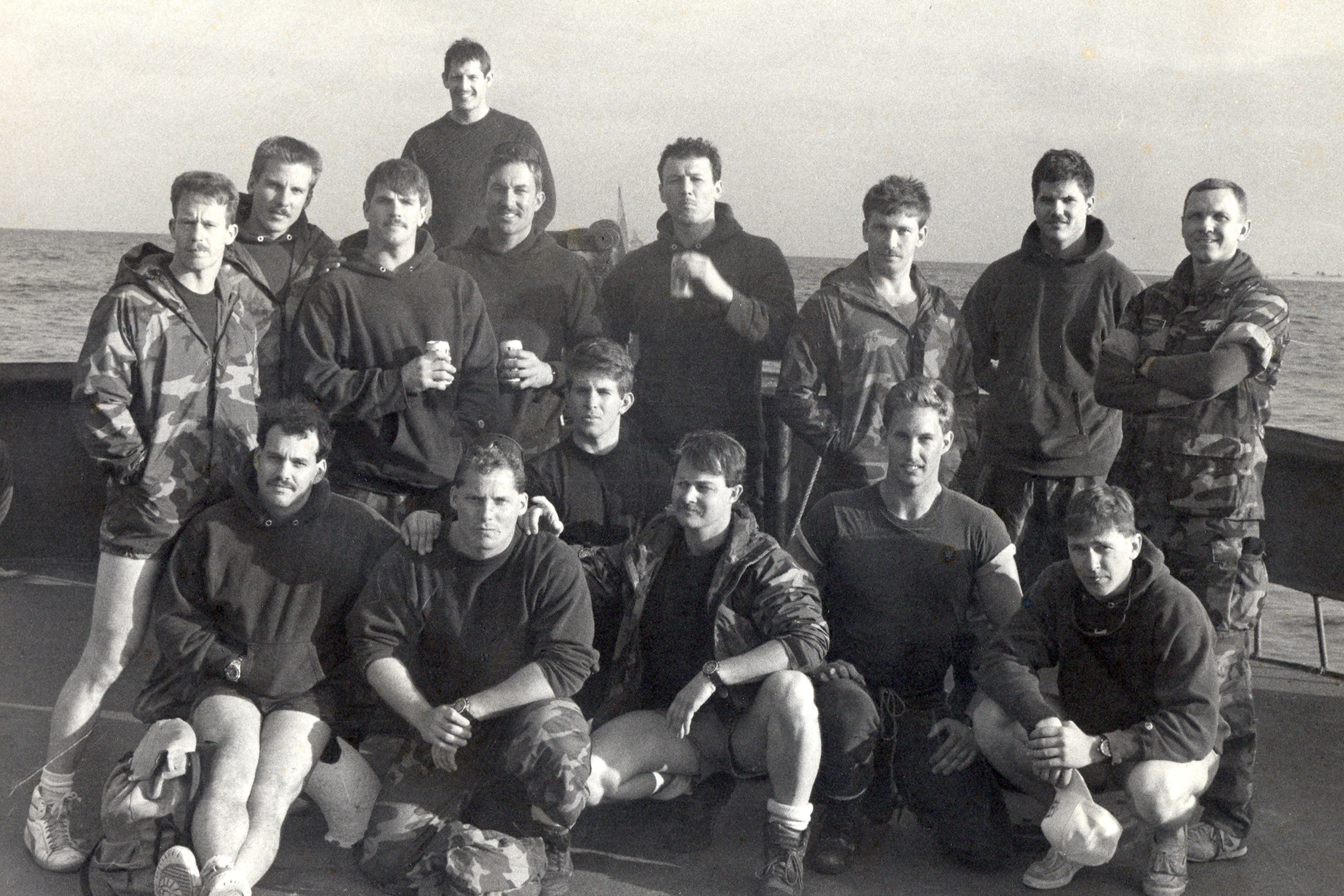
Members of SEAL Team 4 immediately before the start of Operation Just Cause

The United States Navy contributed extensive special operations assets to Panama's invasion, codenamed Operation Just Cause. This included SEAL Teams 2 and 4, Naval Special Warfare Unit 8, and Special Boat Unit 26, all falling under Naval Special Warfare Group 2; and the separate Naval Special Warfare Development Group (DEVGRU). DEVGRU fell under Task Force Blue, while Naval Special Warfare Group 2 composed the entirety of Task Force White. Task Force White was tasked with three principal objectives: the destruction of Panamanian Defense Forces (PDF) naval assets in Balboa Harbor and the destruction of Manuel Noriega's private jet at Paitilla Airport (collectively known as Operation Nifty Package), as well as isolating PDF forces on Flamenco Island.

The strike on Balboa Harbor by Task Unit Whiskey is notably marked in SEAL history as the first publicly acknowledged combat swimmer mission since the Second World War. Prior to the commencement of the invasion four Navy SEALs swam underwater into the harbor on Draeger LAR-V rebreathers and attached C-4 explosives to and destroyed Noriega's personal gunboat the Presidente Porras.

Task Unit Papa was tasked with the seizure of Paitilla airfield and the destruction of Noriega's plane there. Several SEALs were concerned about the nature of the mission assigned to them being that airfield seizure was usually the domain of the Army Rangers. Despite these misgivings and a loss of operational surprise, the SEALs of TU Papa proceeded with their mission. Almost immediately upon landing, the 48 SEALs came under withering fire from the PDF stationed at the airfield. Although Noriega's plane was eventually destroyed, the SEALs suffered four dead, including Chief Petty Officer Donald McFaul, and thirteen wounded.

=== Persian Gulf War ===
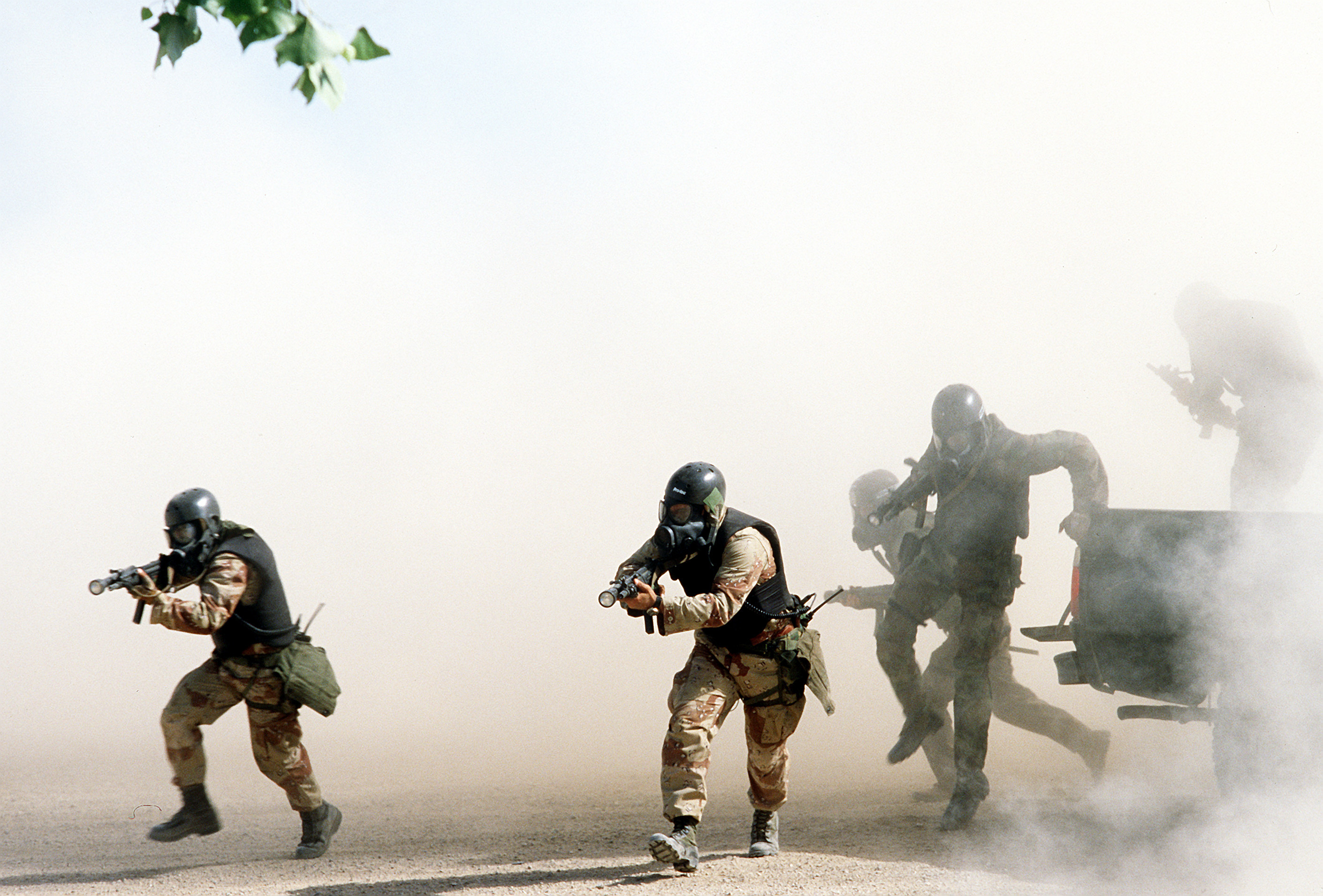
SEAL team members wearing nuclear, chemical and biological (NBC) masks

In August 1990, SEALs were the first western forces to deploy to the Persian Gulf as part of Operation Desert Shield. They infiltrated Kuwait the capital city within hours of the invasion and gathered intelligence and developed plans to rescue US embassy staff should they become hostages. SEALs were also the first to capture Iraqi Prisoners of War when they assaulted nine Kuwaiti Oil platforms on 19 January 1991. On 23 February 1991, a seven-man SEAL team launched a mission to trick the Iraqi military into thinking an amphibious assault on Kuwait by coalition forces was imminent by setting off explosives and placing marking buoys 500 meters off the Kuwaiti coast. The mission was a success and Iraqi forces were diverted east away from the true coalition offensive. The SEALs were first into Kuwait City in their Desert Patrol Vehicles when it was recaptured.

=== Somalia Intervention ===
On 6 December 1992, as part of Operation Restore Hope, U.S. Navy SEALs and Special Boat crewmen from Naval Special Warfare Task Unit TRIPOLI began a three-day operation carrying out reconnaissance operations in the vicinity of Mogadishu airport and harbor; ahead of UNITAFs deployment to the country. They suffered only one casualty, who was injured by an IED.

In August 1993 a four-person DEVGRU SEAL sniper team was deployed to Mogadishu to work alongside Delta Force as part of Task Force Ranger in the search for Somali warlord Mohammed Farrah Aidid. They took part in several operations in support of the CIA and Army culminating in the 3 October 'Battle of Mogadishu' where they were part of the ground convoy raiding the Olympic Hotel. All four SEALs would be later awarded the Silver Star in recognition of their bravery while Navy SEAL Howard E. Wasdin would be awarded a Purple Heart after continuing to fight despite being wounded three times during the battle.

=== War in Afghanistan ===
==== Invasion ====
In the immediate aftermath of the September 11 attacks, Navy SEALs quickly dispatched to Camp Doha, and those already aboard U.S. Naval vessels in the Persian Gulf and surrounding waters began conducting VBSS operations against ships suspected of having ties to or even carrying al Qaeda operatives. SEAL Teams 3 and 8 also began rotating into Oman from the United States and staging on the island of Masirah for operations in Afghanistan. One of the SEALs' immediate concerns was their lack of suitable vehicles to conduct special reconnaissance (SR) missions in the rough, landlocked terrain of Afghanistan. After borrowing and retrofitting Humvees from the Army Rangers also staging on Masirah, the SEALs entered Afghanistan to conduct the SR of what would become Camp Rhino, as part of Operation Enduring Freedom – Afghanistan (OEF-A). These early stages of OEF were commanded by a fellow SEAL, Rear Admiral Albert Calland.

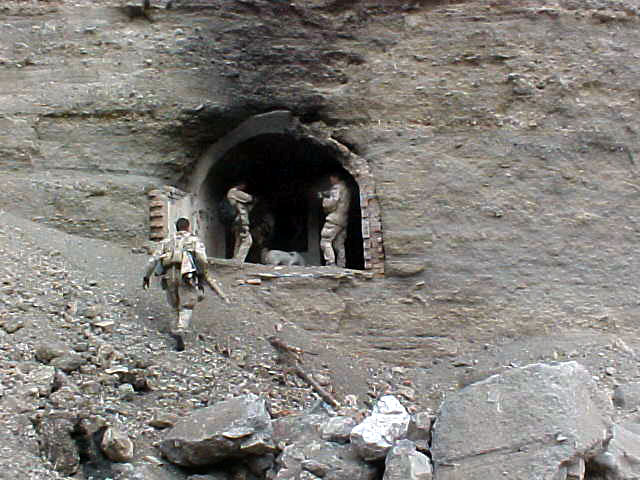
Task Force K-Bar SEALs at one of the entrances to the Zhawar Kili cave complex.

As part of the CJSOTF (Combined Joint Special Operations Task Force) under the command of General Tommy Franks at CENTCOM, SEALs from DEVGRU were part of Task Force Sword, which was established in early October 2001. It was a black SOF (Special Operations Forces) unit under direct command of JSOC. It was a so-called hunter-killer force whose primary objective was to capture or kill senior leadership and HVT within both al-Qaeda and the Taliban. Sword was initially structured around a two-squadron component of operators from Delta Force (Task Force Green) and DEVGRU (Task Force Blue) supported by a Ranger protection force team (Task Force Red), ISA signals intercept and surveillance operators (Task Force Orange) and the 160th SOAR (Task Force Brown). Task Force K-Bar was established on 10 October 2001, it was formed around a Naval Special Warfare Group consisting of SEALs from SEAL Teams 2, 3 and 8 and Green Berets from 1st Battalion, 3rd SFG; the task force was led by SEAL Captain Robert Harward.

The task force's principal task was to conduct SR and SSE missions in the south of the country. Other Coalition SOF-particularly KSK, JTF2 and New Zealand Special Air Service were assigned to the task force. As part of the JIATF-CT (Joint Interagency Task Force-Counterterrorism)—intelligence integration and fusion activity composed of personnel from all of Operation Enduring Freedom – Afghanistan-participating units—SEALs from DEVGRU were part of Task Force Bowie, they were embedded in the task force in AFOs (Advanced Force Operations). The AFOs were 45-man reconnaissances units made up of Delta Force recce specialists augmented by selected SEALs from DEVGRU and supported by ISA's technical experts. The AFOs had been raised to support TF Sword and were tasked with intelligence preparation of the battlefield, working closely with the CIA and reported directly to Task Force Sword. The AFOs conducted covert reconnaissance—sending small two or three-man teams into al-Qaeda 'Backyard' along the border with Pakistan, the AFO operators would deploy observation posts to watch and report enemy movements and numbers as well as environmental reconnaissance; much of the work was done on foot or ATVs.

SEALs were present at the Battle of Qala-i-Jangi in November 2001 alongside their counterparts from the British SBS. Chief Petty Officer Stephen Bass was awarded the Navy Cross for his actions during the battle.

Before the US Marines landed at Camp Rhino in November 2001, a SEAL recce team from SEAL Team 8 conducted reconnaissance of the area, they were mistakenly engaged by orbiting AH-1W attack helicopters, but the SEALs managed to get a message through to the Marines before they suffered casualties. The SR mission in the region of Camp Rhino lasted for four days, after which two United States Air Force Combat Control Teams made a nighttime HALO jump to assist the SEALs in guiding in Marines from the 15th Marine Expeditionary Unit who seized control of the area and established a forward operating base.

==== Post-invasion ====
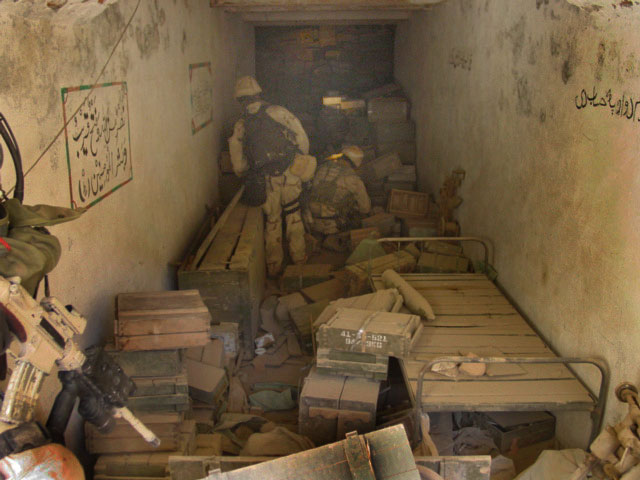
Task Force K-Bar SEALs searching munitions found in the Zhawar Kili cave complex

In January 2002, following the Battle of Tora Bora, another series of caves was discovered in Zhawar Kili, just south of Tora Bora; airstrikes hit the sites before SOF teams were inserted into the area. A SEAL platoon from SEAL Team 3, including several of their Desert Patrol Vehicles, accompanied by a German KSK element, a Norwegian SOF team and JTF2 reconnaissance teams spent some nine days conducting extensive SSE, clearing an estimated 70 caves and 60 structures in the area, recovering a huge amount of both intelligence and munitions, but they didn't encounter any al-Qaeda fighters. Subsequent SEAL operations during the invasion of Afghanistan were conducted within Task Force K-Bar, a joint special operations unit of Army Special Forces, United States Air Force Special Tactics Teams, and special operations forces from Norway, Germany, Australia, New Zealand, Canada, and Denmark. Task Force K-Bar conducted combat operations in the massive cave complexes near the city of Kandahar and surrounding territory, the town of Prata Ghar and hundreds of miles of rough terrain in southern and eastern Afghanistan. Over the course of six months, Task Force K-Bar killed or captured over 200 Taliban and al Qaeda fighters and destroyed tens of thousands of pounds of weapons and ordnance.

In February 2002, while at Camp Rhino, the CIA passed on intelligence from a Predator drone operating in the Paktia province that Taliban Mullah Khirullah Said Wali Khairkhwa was spotted leaving a building by vehicle convoy. SEALs and Danish Jægerkorpset commandos boarded Air Force Pave Low helicopters and seized Khairkhwa on the road less than two hours later. The SEALs continued to perform reconnaissance operations for the Marines until leaving after having spent 45 days on the ground.

In March 2002, SEALs from DEVGRU, SEAL Teams 2, 3 and 8 participated extensively in Operation Anaconda. During what would become known as the Battle of Takur Ghar, whilst inserting from an MH-47E Chinook, PO1 Neil Roberts from DEVGRU, was thrown from his helicopter when it took fire from entrenched al Qaeda fighters. Roberts was subsequently killed after engaging and fighting dozens of enemies for almost an hour. Several SEALs were wounded in a rescue attempt and their Air Force Combat Controller, Technical Sergeant John Chapman, was killed. Attempts to rescue the stranded SEAL also led to the deaths of several US Army Rangers and an Air Force Pararescueman acting as a Quick Reaction Force.

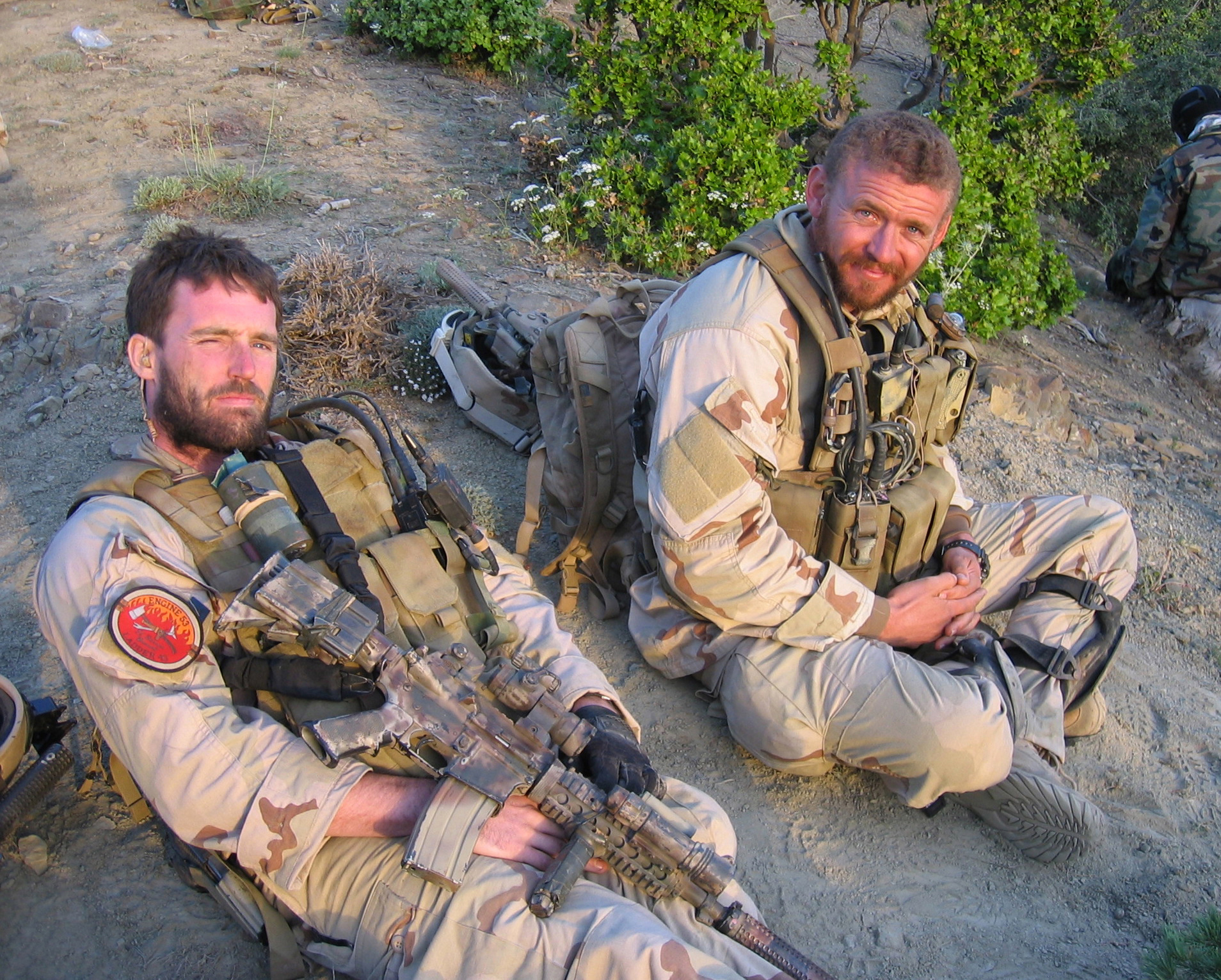
Navy SEALs LT Michael P. Murphy and STG2 Matthew Axelson in Afghanistan, both of whom were killed in action

Later in 2002, CJSOFT became a single integrated command under the broader CJTF-180 that commanded all US forces assigned to OEF-A, it was built around an Army Special Forces Group (composed of soldiers from National Guard units) and SEAL teams. A small JSOC element (formerly Task Force Sword/11) not under direct CTJF command—embedded within CJSOFT, it consisted of a joint SEAL and Ranger element that rotated command, and was not under direct ISAF command, although it operated in support of NATO operations.

In June 2005, Lieutenant Michael P. Murphy was posthumously awarded the Medal of Honor after his four-man reconnaissance counterinsurgency team was almost wiped out during Operation Red Wings. After the four-man team lost Danny Dietz, he put himself in open view to call in the QRF. He soon after died from injuries sustained. Matthew Axelson also died on this operation. The QRF never reached the scene; it was struck by an RPG killing eight Navy SEALs and eight Army Night Stalkers. Marcus Luttrell was the only survivor from this operation.

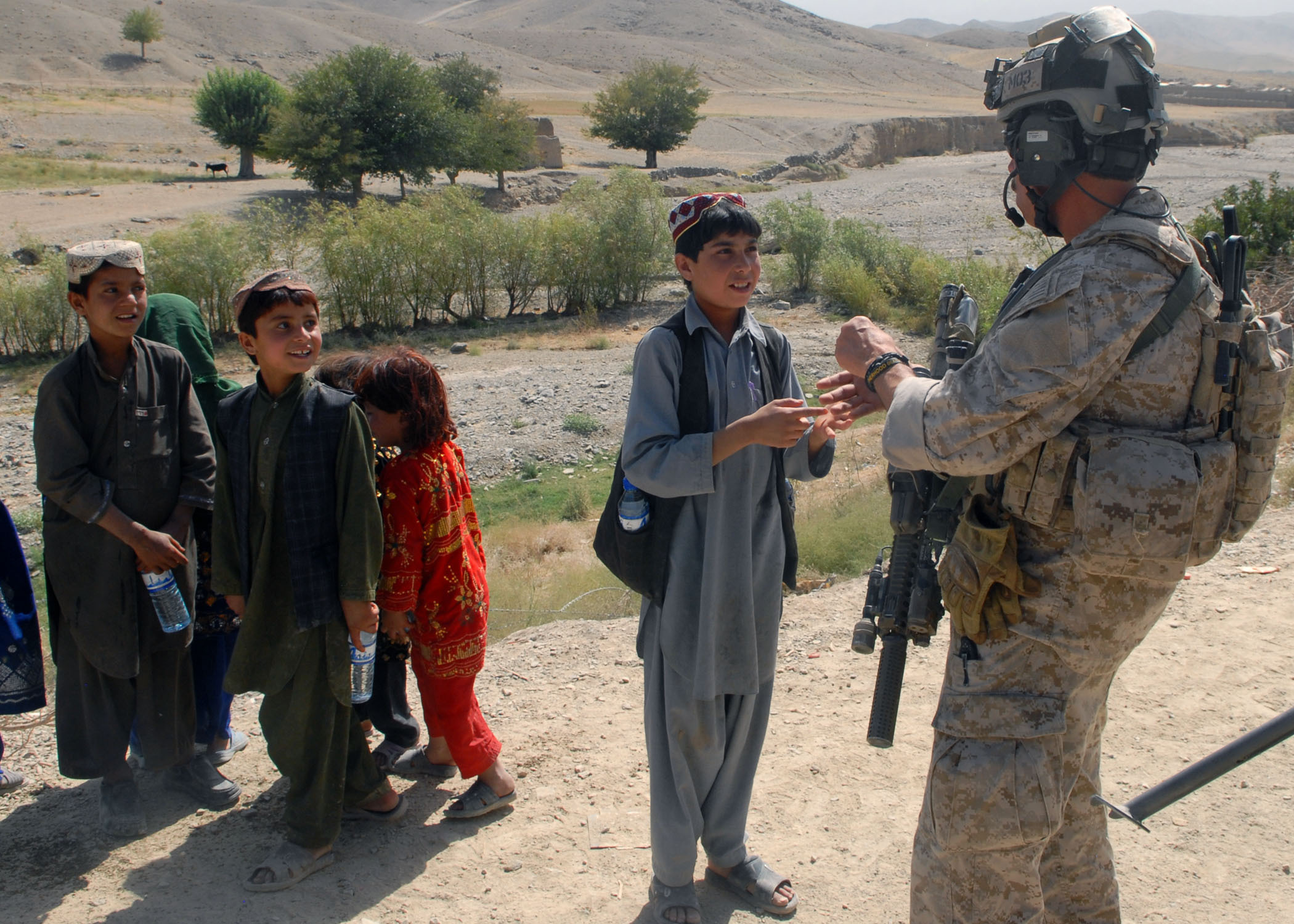
A US Navy SEAL, assigned to Special Operations Task Force-South East, greets children in a village in Uruzgan Province, 30 August 2012.

In early 2010, Brigadier General Scott Miller took command of CJSOTF-Afghanistan and assigned virtually all SOF in the theatre to a new counterinsurgency role that would become known as the ALP/VSO Program (Afghan Local Police/Village Stability Operations), the SOF in Afghanistan were organized into battalion level SOTF (Special Operations Task Forces) each with a geographic area of responsibility-the SEALs were given southeast Afghanistan. To increase security of their assigned VSO village, a SEAL Platoon in Chora District, Uruzgan Province built a wall constructed of 500 metres (550 yd) of HESCO barriers to divert insurgent movements away, this proved successful and eventually the Afghan villagers took ownership of it. SEALs and other SOTF still conducted Direct Action missions, but now partnered with Afghan forces.

On 6 August 2011, seventeen U.S. Navy SEALs were killed when their CH-47 Chinook helicopter was shot down by an RPG fired by Taliban militants. The SEALs were en route to support U.S. Army Rangers who were taking fire while attempting to capture a senior Taliban leader in the Tangi Valley. Fifteen of the SEALs belonged to the Naval Special Warfare Development Group. Two others were SEALs assigned to a West Coast-based Naval Special Warfare unit. A total of 30 Americans and eight Afghans were killed in the crash, making it the single largest loss of U.S. lives in the Global War on Terrorism.

On 16 August 2012, SEALs in Uruzgan Province conducted a joint operation into the Shah Wali Kot Valley where they suffered the loss of a Black Hawk helicopter when it was struck by an insurgent RPG, the crash killed 11 servicemen (seven US and four Afghan).

In December 2012, SEALs from DEVGRU rescued a US doctor who had been kidnapped a few days earlier. However, during the operation the unit suffered a fatality, Petty Officer 1st Class Nicolas D. Checque. Senior Chief Edward Byers was awarded the Medal of Honor for his actions during this mission.

In May 2013, Rear Admiral Sean Pybus, commander of Navy Special Warfare, stated that the unit would cut in half the number of SEAL platoons in Afghanistan by the end of 2013. Pybus also added that the unit is already "undergoing a transition back to its maritime roots" by placing more emphasis on sea-based missions after being involved in mostly landlocked missions since 2001.

=== Iraq War ===
==== Invasion ====
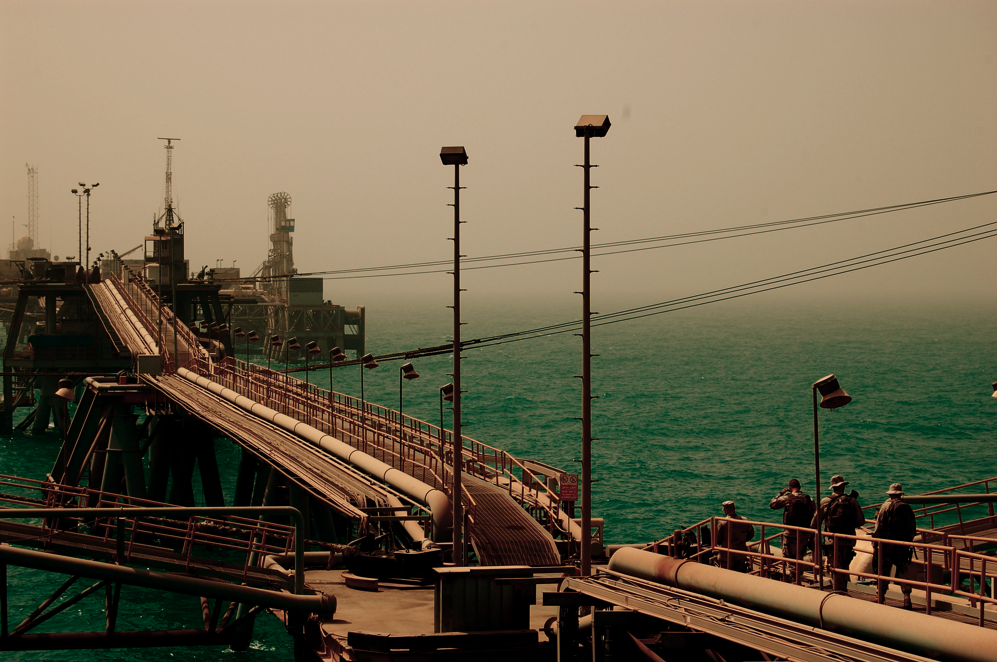
US military security personnel on the Al Basrah Oil Terminal after its capture

For the 2003 invasion of Iraq, a squadron from DEVGRU operated as part of Task Force 20. Their role was to conduct heliborne direct action raids, particularly against HVTs. The Naval Special Operations Task Group was assigned to Operation Iraqi Freedom, and was built around a core of SEAL Teams 8 and 10, Polish GROM, Royal Marines from 40 and 42 Commando under the command of 3 Commando Brigade and attached US Psy Ops and civil affairs teams. The Naval Task Group was principally tasked with the capture of the port of Umm Qasr, Iraq's only deep-water port; the oil pipeline facilities of the Al-Faw Peninsula; and the two off-shore platforms the pipelines fed. Once these initial target sets were secured, the Task Group would support conventional forces in the south, conducting reconnaissance and raiding activities. Aviation support was provided by both Marine air of the 15th MEU and 20th Special Operations Squadron.

Several days before the beginning of the invasion, two SDV teams were launched from Mark V Special Operations Craft in the Persian Gulf. Their objectives were the hydrographic reconnaissance of the Al Basrah (MABOT) and Khawr Al Amaya (KAAOT) Oil Terminals. After swimming under the terminals and securing their Mark 8 mod 1s, the SDV SEALs spent several hours taking pictures and surveying Iraqi activity on both platforms before returning to their boats. On 20 March 2003, SEALs from SEAL Team 8 and 10 (31 SEALs, 2 Navy EOD a USAF combat controller and several Iraqi interpreters) moved to seize the MABOT oil terminal whilst GROM operators assaulted the KAAOT Oil Terminals. The terminals were quickly seized with no casualties, and explosives which were found on the terminals were made safe by GROM operators.

The shore-based pumping stations (known as MMS-Monitoring and Meter Stations) and their pipelines on the Al-Faw Peninsula were seized by 12 SEALS from SEAL Team 3, who were mounted in DPVs. They took off from Kuwait and were inserted under Iraqi anti-aircraft fire by MH-53 helicopters. The target area was 'softened up' by JDAM bombs dropped from B-52s on Iraqi bunkers, trenches and dugouts around the oil facilities. After a brief firefight in which the SEALs killed 1 Iraqi soldier and captured 13, the SEALs secured the MMS and the pipelines and were relieved by Royal Marines from 40 Commando. The SEALs advised the Marines, helping coordinate AC-130 Spectres fire support onto Iraqi forces. The other shore-based pumping station at Umm Qasr was secured by SEALs and Royal Marines; before they landed, AC-130 Spectres and A-10As engaged a nearby SAM installation and a responding Iraqi mechanized unit. The SEALs secured the facility itself whilst the Royal Marines cleared Iraqi bunkers, killing several Iraqi soldiers.

Other Naval Task Group operations included elements of three SEAL platoons in GMV trucks and DPVs seizing the al Zubayr MMS, whilst I MEF attacked the Rumaylah Oil Fields north of al-Faw. SEALs and Special Boat teams helped secure the Khawr Abd Allah and Khawr Az Zubyar waterways, which enabled humanitarian supplies to be delivered to the port of Umm Qasr. SEALs from the unit that secured the al-Faw MMS also conducted reconnaissance on the Shat Al Arab waterway, which was later secured by British forces. SEALs were also involved in various VBSS missions with British and Australian forces to seize Iraqi craft carrying seaborne mines.

Coalition military planners were concerned that retreating Iraqi forces would destroy the Mukatayin hydroelectric dam, located 57 miles northeast of Baghdad, in an attempt to slow advancing US troops. In addition to restricting the manoeuvre of Coalition forces, the destruction of the dam would deny critical power needs to the surrounding area, as well as cause massive flooding and loss of Iraqi civilian life. A mixed team of SEALs from SEAL Team 5 and Polish GROM was called in to seize the dam. This force was flown several hours by six US Air Force MH-53J Pave Lows; the force consisted of 20 SEALs (with an extra six SEAL snipers in one helicopter carrying the SEAL command and control element) and two EOD operators along with 35 GROM operators to the dam. The SEALs employed DPVs into blocking positions to defend against counterattack and roving bands of Iranian bandits that had been crossing the border and raiding Iraqi towns. As in Al Faw, the SEALs found their DPVs (the SEAL unit at the al-Faw MMS lost all but two DPVs when they were bogged down in the oily mud) to be ineffective, and this marked the last time they would employ them in Iraq. The SEALs and GROM on foot fast-roped out of their helicopters and immediately stormed the dam. The minimal Iraqi troops guarding the dam surrendered without a fight, and with the exception of a GROM soldier who broke an ankle during the insertion, no casualties were sustained in the operation. After several hours of searching the dam for remaining hostile forces or any explosives, the SEALs secured the dam and held it for five days until they were relieved by advancing elements of the US Army.

During the Battle of Basra, SEALs along with the Brigade Reconnaissance Force and 539 Assault Squadron RM attempted a waterborne approach to Basra via the Shatt al-Arab waterway but were intercepted by Iranian Revolutionary Guard patrol craft and did not want to engage them so they withdrew. On 6 April 2003, after relocating further up the waterway they successfully infiltrated via the waterway, using SEAL UAVs they called in "show-of-force" and an airstrike by a USMC Harrier on Iraqi troops, the SEALs then headed to "Chemical Ali's" house with SSE teams to find traces of chemical weapons. SEALs carried out missions around Nasiriyah, carrying out reconnaissance on surrounding villages and engaging enemy strong points bypassed by the US Marine advance. Charlie Platoon, SEAL Team 3, later operated ahead of the Marine advance carrying out similar missions. SEAL and GROM units continued to cooperate throughout the rest of the invasion phase, with raids and anti-sniper missions in Baghdad.

==== Post-invasion Iraq ====
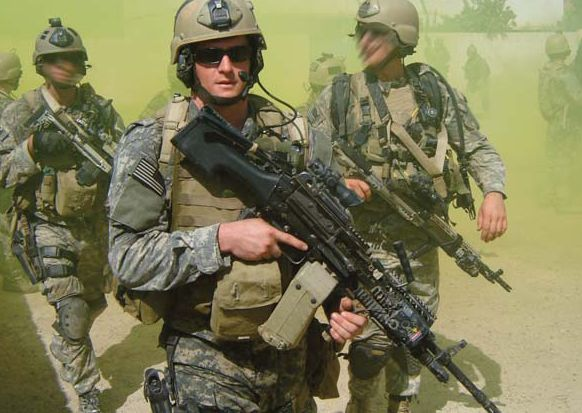
Petty Officer Michael A. Monsoor, the second Navy SEAL killed in Iraq. This photo was taken during an extraction after a firefight, and the smoke was used to conceal their movements from the enemy.

Following the invasion, SEAL platoons rotated through Iraq, conducting overwatch for US and Iraqi patrols and directly mentoring local Iraqi forces; they also conducted surveillance and sniping missions into known trouble spots. In September 2004, a SEAL sniper element was tasked with establishing an overwatch and surveillance position overlooking Haifa Street, they were inserted by Bradley IFVs from a unit of the 9th Cavalry Regiment, however they were spotted and engaged by insurgents. The SEALs notified the Bradleys, they drove back, fired on the insurgents and set up a cordon for the SEALs to be extracted, one Bradley was destroyed by a car bomb, there were no casualties, and the SEALs were extracted.

In the interim between the First Battle of Fallujah and Second Battle of Fallujah, insurgents in Fallujah knew that the coalition assault was inevitable and under the guidance of the influx of foreign fighters, began to build defensive networks throughout the city-ranging from fortified buildings, trench lines, berms, strategically placed car bombs and IEDs. In preparations for the second battle, SEALs conducted reconnaissance near the berms and tested out reports that the insurgents were equipped with night-vision equipment, they proved this by throwing an infrared chemical light into the street which drew small arms fire. SEALs along with the 5th SFG, Marine Force Recon and Det One and other JSOC elements were heavily involved in shaping operations prior to 7 November D-DAY when coalition forces entered the city. The SOF shaping included sophisticated feints to mislead the insurgents as to the direction of the final assault, close target reconnaissance and direct-action missions where a logistics node or IED factory was targeted. When the offensive on the insurgents in the city began, many of the US Marine companies had SEAL sniper teams attached to them, mainly from SEAL Teams 3, 5 and 10.

From 2005, SEALs were heavily committed to western Iraq in Al Anbar Governorate, AQI terrorists who escaped Fallujah had relocated to Ramadi. A SEAL Task Unit was co-located with the Marines at Al Asad Airbase and sent elements to Ramadi and Habbaniyah, the SEALs were initially tasked with target development for the Marines and providing sniper overwatch for their patrols. The SEALs were already training an Iraqi Army unit in Habbaniyah, although FID was their main focus until later that year. A SEAL Task Unit generally comprised two individual SEAL Platoons: each Platoon was made up of seven-man squad elements commanded by a junior officer, three of these Task Units (although a fourth was often added) along with a Special Boat Team detachment and a Headquarters Team (including integral intelligence, targeting and EOD personnel) made up a Naval Special Warfare Squadron. According to Dick Couch, the SEALs began FID with two Iraqi units-the Army Scouts who conducted conventional reconnaissance missions, and the SMP (Special Missions Platoon), a locally formed unit that would later fight alongside the SEALs. Despite several challenges, the SEALs were soon conducted operations with partnered units, particularly in Special Reconnaissance, focusing on the surveillance aspect, whilst conventional US Army or Marines would conduct raids and arrests. The typical loadout of the SEALs in Ramadi included the M4 carbine, optimized for close quarter battle with a 10-inch barrel equipped with a 6-inch sound suppressor, Surefire flashlight and EOTech sight, vertical foregrip, and seven magazines.

As the SEALs were beginning to make headway in Ramadi, AQI was starting to infiltrate the area by targeting local Sheikhs and convincing them to allow jihadists to marry into local tribes, thus cementing their powerbase and Sheikhs that resisted these advances were met with typical AQI brutality. Al-Qaeda's efforts to install a Sharia-style shadow government in Ramadi led to AQI's downfall-when in the first half of 2006, in the run-up to the Second Battle of Ramadi SEALs, increasingly partnered with conventional forces of the 1st Brigade Combat Team, 1st Armored Division which was planning the offensive. SEALs along with the Scouts and SMP, would conduct reconnaissance, surveillance and sniper overwatch tasks; with their own targeting cell, they also began conducting raids on local insurgent leaders. The 1st BCT began the concerted offensive to clear Ramadi of AQI fighters; on 29 September 2006, whilst at a rooftop overwatch position, Petty Officer Michael A. Monsoor died after leaping upon an enemy grenade during a rooftop firefight, two SEALs on the roof were badly wounded from the grenade fragments and their local Iraqi Scouts ran back into the cover of the building, a fourth SEAL (only lightly wounded), managed to radio his colleagues and get the Scouts to return fire. A SEAL element in a second overwatch position immediately ran through heavy fire to reach Monsoor (whom later died from his wounds in the back of a Bradley IFV) and the wounded SEALs, Monsoor was later awarded the Medal of Honor and the Silver Star. The advances by conventional forces and the SEALs in Ramadi, combined with the brutal tactics of AQI, helped to increase recruitment in a local police initiative-the programme was designed to bring the local Sheikhs' militias into the Iraqi Security Forces. These volunteers would serve locally in their communities to defend them against al-Qaeda, a month after the kidnapping and murder of Sheikh Khalid by AQI (which proved to be the tipping point), the Sheikhs signed a declaration agreeing to fight AQI and by the closing of 2006, even former insurgents were joining the local police (later known as the Anbar Awakening) by the end of the battle, some 1,100 terrorists were killed.

In Fallujah, the SEAL Task Unit were also heavily involved in fighting. In one joint operation to capture an AQI leader, they entered the target building and were engaged resulting in an Iraqi Scout being killed and a SEAL severely wounded, two SEALs returned fire and entered the building, both SEALs entered different rooms, in one room the SEAL encountered three insurgents who opened fired at close range, another SEAL across the hallway was struck in the head and killed, the SEAL in the room with the insurgents killed all three.

In September 2009, in a nighttime raid in Fallujah, SEALs captured Ahmad Hashim Abd al-Isawi (nicknamed the "Butcher of Fallujah"), an al-Qaeda jihadist who was the alleged mastermind behind the 2004 Fallujah ambush. Al-Isawai made accusations of mistreatment while in custody, and testified in April 2010 at the ensuing courts-martial against three SEALs (all of whom were acquitted). Iraqi authorities later tried and executed al-Isawi by hanging at some point before November 2013.

SEALs remained employed throughout the Iraqi Campaign as Task Units or Task Elements until its close in 2011.

=== Operation Enduring Freedom – Philippines ===
OEF-P was established in 2002 to conduct long-term partnered operations with both Philippine Army special operations and intelligence units, as well as police units, to counter the threat posed by the ASG and JI terrorist groups. Much of this work has been assigned to 1st SFG; SEALs and USAF Special Operations who have also had a long-term presence in the Philippines. There are few confirmed operational details about the SEALs and Green Berets conducting partnered operations, although elements are partnered with Philippine Army and SOF; there have been mentions of Green Berets and SEALs wounded. On 21 June 2002, SEALs in RIBs supported the Philippine Naval Special Operations Group in the operation that killed Abu Sabaya, a senior leader in the ASG. A US Predator UAV marked the HVT with an infrared laser as he tried to escape in a smugglers boat; the MH-47Es from the 160th SOAR used search lights mounted on their helicopters to pinpoint the target's boat while operators from the Philippine Naval Special Operations Group opened fire on the boat killing the terrorist leader and capturing four other terrorists with him.

=== Operation Enduring Freedom – Horn of Africa ===
As part of OEF-HOA, Naval Special Warfare Unit 10 are deployed to Camp Lemonnier, Djibouti, under the command of SOCCE-HOA (Special Operations Command and Control Element-Horn of Africa) which commands all SOCOM units assigned to training or operational missions in the region. Special operations carried out in Somalia are conducted under the codename: Operation Octave Dune, as part of the overall effort in Somalia, which is known as Operation Octave Shield.

Before Djibouti became the epicentre for counter terrorism operations in Africa, unilateral operations were launched from temporary forward locations in friendly nations such as Kenya, or from US Navy ships. The earliest known operation in Somalia was known as Operation Cobalt Blue: In 2003, SEALs using SEAL Delivery Vehicles swam ashore along the Somali coastline and emplaced covert surveillance cameras. Known as cardinals, the cameras were designed to watch likely target locations for wanted terrorists as al-Qaeda and its affiliates began to regroup in the country, however the cameras only took one image a day and captured very little.

CJSOTF-HOA (Combined Joint Special Operations Task Force-Horn of Africa) developed a rescue plan called Operation Mystic Talon, in case any CIA SAD or ISA operators were captured in the region, the plan required a SEAL platoon with Air Force Special Operations assets that, if necessary, would fight their way into Somalia, recover the hostage and fight their way out, should a mission need to be launched before a dedicated JSOC task force could be deployed to the region.

==== Maersk Alabama hijacking ====
On 12 April 2009, in response to a hostage taking incident off the coast of Somalia by Somali pirates, three Navy SEALs from DEVGRU simultaneously engaged and killed the three pirates who were closely holding the hostage, Captain Richard Phillips, of the freighter ship Maersk Alabama. The pirates and their hostage were being towed in a lifeboat approximately 100 yards behind USS Bainbridge when each of the pirates were killed by a different DEVGRU sniper with a single shot to the head.

=== Death of Osama bin Laden ===
In the early morning of 2 May 2011 local time, a team of Navy SEALs of the Naval Special Warfare Development Group (DEVGRU), previously called "SEAL Team 6", along with a Belgian Malinois Military Working Dog (named "Cairo"), supported by Special Activities Division officers on the ground, killed Osama bin Laden in Abbottabad, Pakistan about 35 miles (56 km) from Islamabad in a CIA operation. President Barack Obama later confirmed the death of bin Laden, but did not directly mention the involvement of DEVGRU, saying only that a "small team" of Americans undertook the operation to bring down bin Laden. The unprecedented media coverage raised the public profile of the SEAL community, particularly the counter-terrorism specialists commonly known as SEAL Team 6. The Walt Disney Company tried unsuccessfully to trademark the name "SEAL Team 6" the day after the raid. The official name of the military operation was Operation Neptune Spear. The model of the compound used in the 60 Minutes documentary was donated by CBS to the Navy SEAL Museum.

=== Morning Glory oil tanker ===
On 16 March 2014, thirty U.S. Navy SEALs from SEAL Team 2 took control of MV Morning Glory, a tanker full of oil loaded from a rebel-held port in Libya. The raid by Navy SEALs took place in international waters off the coast of Cyprus; the raid was a success, preventing a Libyan splinter militia group selling nationalized Libyan oil on the black market.

=== Operation Inherent Resolve ===
As part of Operation Inherent Resolve's Iraq Campaign, there are at least 100 SEALs as part of a Special Operations advise and assist mission to Peshmerga and Iraqi Security Forces in combating ISIS. The Navy SEAL operation in northern Iraq is called Task Force Trident. On 3 May 2016, Petty Officer 1st Class Charles Keating IV was killed by ISIS small arms fire near the town of Tel Skuf during an ISIS assault on a Peshmerga position. He was a member of a 20-man Quick Reaction Force (QRF) sent to rescue a dozen U.S. advisors at the position and temporarily assist the Peshmerga. Keating IV was awarded the Navy Cross, posthumously, for his actions.

== Personnel ==
=== Selection and training ===
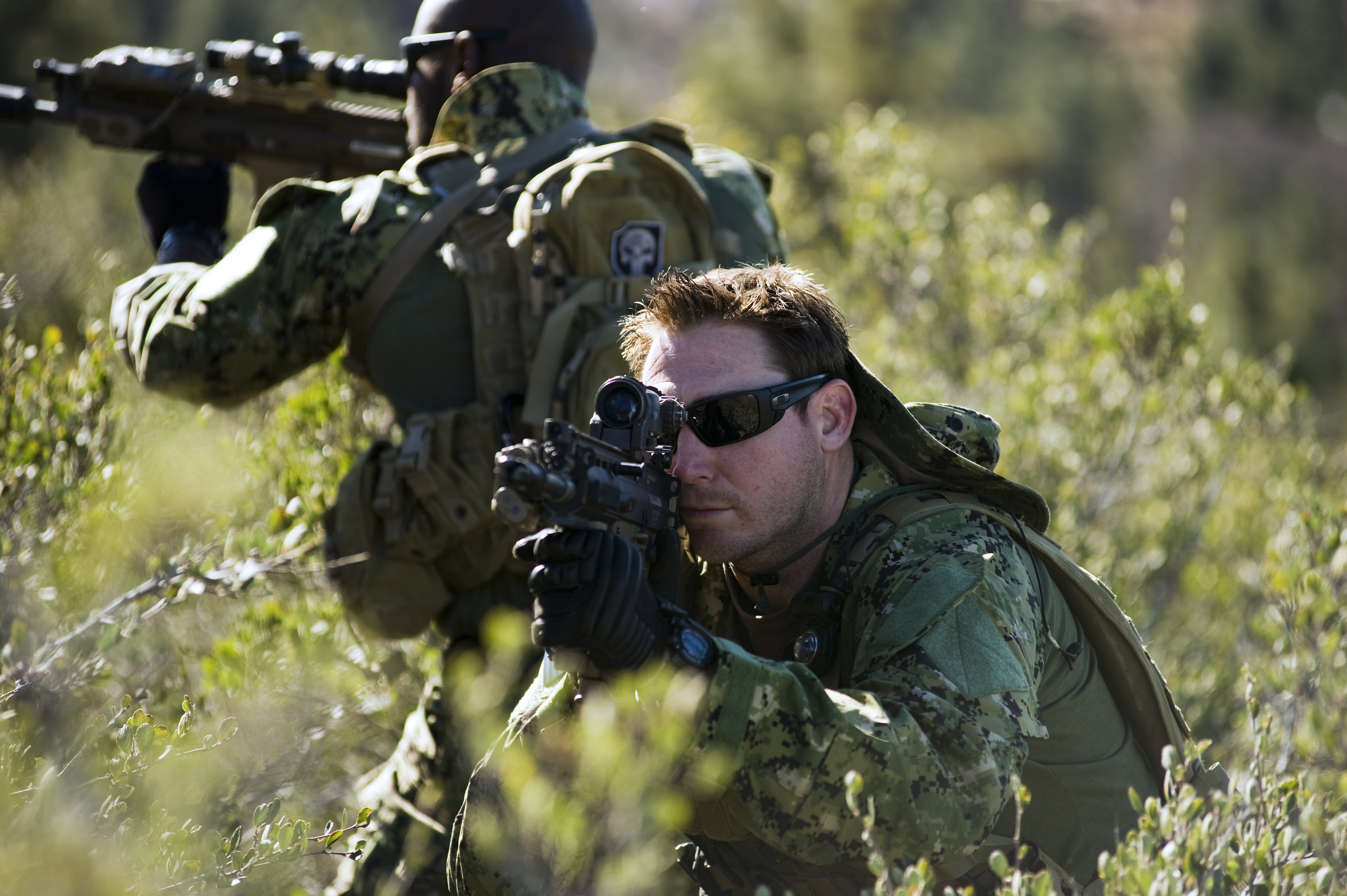
U.S. Navy SEALs conducting training with SCAR rifles

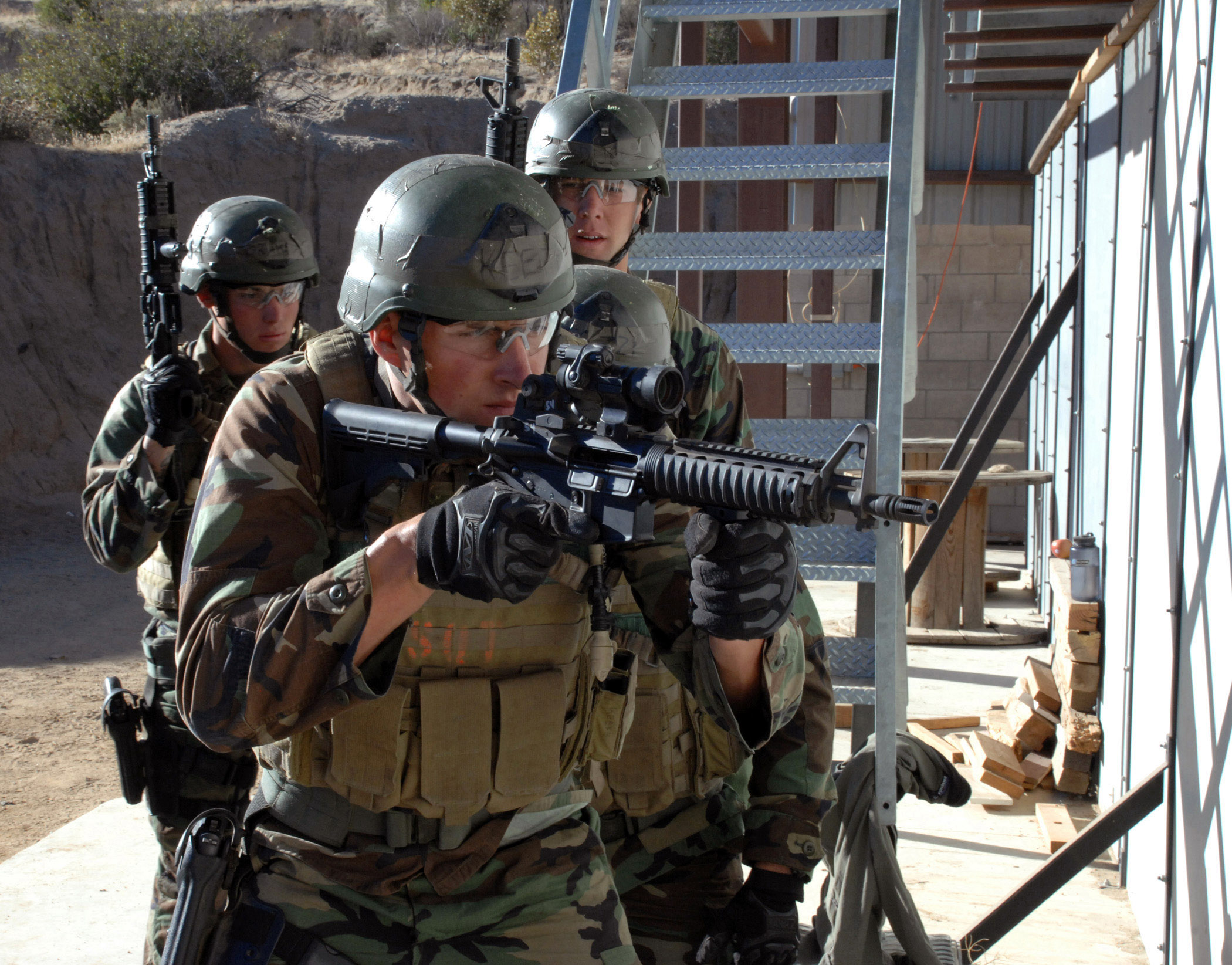
Students armed with Mk 18 mod 0s conduct CQB drills during SEAL Qualification Training

Before getting accepted into Basic Underwater Demolition/SEAL (BUD/S) training, a prospective candidate must pass a certain number of both mental and physical requirements. These tests include: Pre-enlistment medical screening, ASVAB, AFQT, C-SORT, and PST. Then, the candidate must get a SEAL contract by passing the SEAL Physical Screening Test: 500-yard swim in 12:30, 50 push-ups in 2 minutes, 50 sit-ups in 2 minutes, 10 consecutive pull-ups in 2 minutes, and a 1.5-mile run in 10:30. Candidates receiving a passing score may then be admitted into training to become Navy SEALs. SEAL training is extremely rigorous. The attrition rate fluctuates, but averages at about 80 percent.

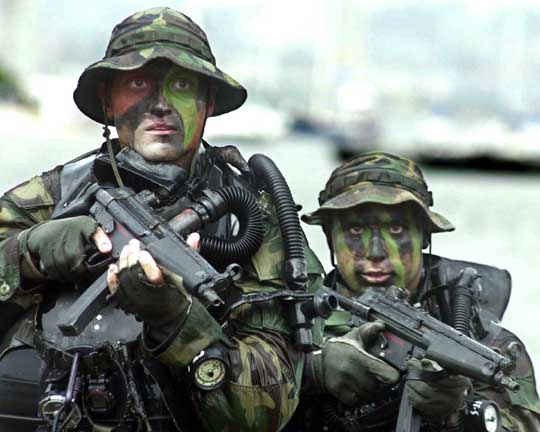
Navy SEALs training with MP5 submachine guns

The average candidate spends more than a year in a series of formal training courses before being awarded the Special Warfare Operator Naval Rating and the Navy Enlisted Classification (NEC) 5326 Combatant Swimmer (SEAL) or, in the case of commissioned naval officers, the designation Naval Special Warfare (SEAL) Officer.

Candidates for the Special Warfare Operator (SO) rating must complete an extensive training pipeline beginning with Basic Underwater Demolition/SEAL (BUD/S) training in Coronado, California. Following BUD/S, candidates attend SEAL Qualification Training (SQT) to further develop tactical skills before earning their SEAL Trident. The entire process typically takes over a year, and the attrition rate for candidates exceeds 75 percent, reflecting the extreme physical and mental demands of the program.

Navy SEAL training pipeline:

- 8-week Naval Recruit Training
- 8-week Naval Special Warfare Prep School (Pre-BUD/S)
- 3-week BUD/S Orientation
- 24-week Basic Underwater Demolition/SEAL Training (BUD/S)
- 3-week Army airborne School
- 26-week SEAL Qualification Training (SQT)

Upon graduation from SQT, trainees receive the U.S. Navy SEAL Trident, designating them as Navy SEALs. They are subsequently assigned to a SEAL Team or SEAL Delivery Vehicle (SDV) Team and begin 18 months of predeployment training before they are considered deployable. This training consists of:

- 6-month Professional Development – Individual Specialty Training (ProDev)
- 6-month Unit Level Training (ULT). ULT is unit training conducted by each Groups Training Detachment. Core unit training blocks are Air Operations, Land Warfare, Maritime, Urban and Special Reconnaissance.
- 6-month Squadron Integration Training (SIT)

Those enlisted SEALs with a medical rating will first attend the Special Operations Combat Medic Course for 6 months in Fort Bragg, North Carolina before joining a team in order to become a SEAL/Special Operator Corpsman. Those pursuing officer positions first attend the Junior Officer Training Course (JOTC) to learn about operations planning and how to perform team briefings. In total it can take over two-and-a-half years to completely train a Navy SEAL for his first deployment.

=== Women ===
Until December 2015, female sailors were barred from becoming Navy SEALs by naval regulation; however, this prohibition no longer exists. As early as August 2015, it was reported that the "Navy is planning to open its elite SEAL teams to women who can pass the grueling training regimen." In that same month, Admiral Jon Greenert, the Chief of Naval Operations at the time, said that "he and the head of Naval Special Warfare Command, Rear Admiral Brian Losey, believe that if women can pass the legendary six-month Basic Underwater Demolition/SEAL (BUD/S) training, they should be allowed to serve." On 3 December 2015, it was announced that there are now "no exceptions" to all military roles in the U.S., and women can become U.S. Navy SEALs.

Since the Navy opened up special warfare jobs to female sailors in 2016 through July 2021, 18 women have attempted to pass Special Warfare Combatant-craft Crewmen (SWCC) and SEAL training with one successfully passing; however, the sole graduate chose a different community and did not reach BUD/S training.

The Washington Examiner reported on 10 August 2017: "A woman aiming to become the first female Navy SEAL officer quit about a week into the initial training".

As of 2025, no woman has been able to finish the process to become a SEAL.

=== Issues ===
In December 2016, the SEALs halted all training and ordered a safety stand-down because of substance abuse within its ranks. As part of the safety stand-down, all SEALs were required to submit to urinalysis. In August 2019, a review of the culture of Special Operations Command was ordered following cases of misconduct involving the SEALS, which included substance abuse by members of SEAL Team 10 and allegations of sexual assault and intoxication by a SEAL platoon in Iraq.

In 2021, SEAL team members appeared on CBS concealing their identities out of concern for retribution. They alerted the public to a culture of lawlessness, misconduct, and war crimes within their ranks.

=== Relationship with CIA ===
The CIA's highly secretive and elite Special Operations Group (SOG) recruits operators from SEAL Teams, with joint operations going back to the MACV-SOG during the Vietnam War. This cooperation still exists today, as evidenced by military operations in Iraq and Afghanistan.

== Navy SEAL teams and structures ==
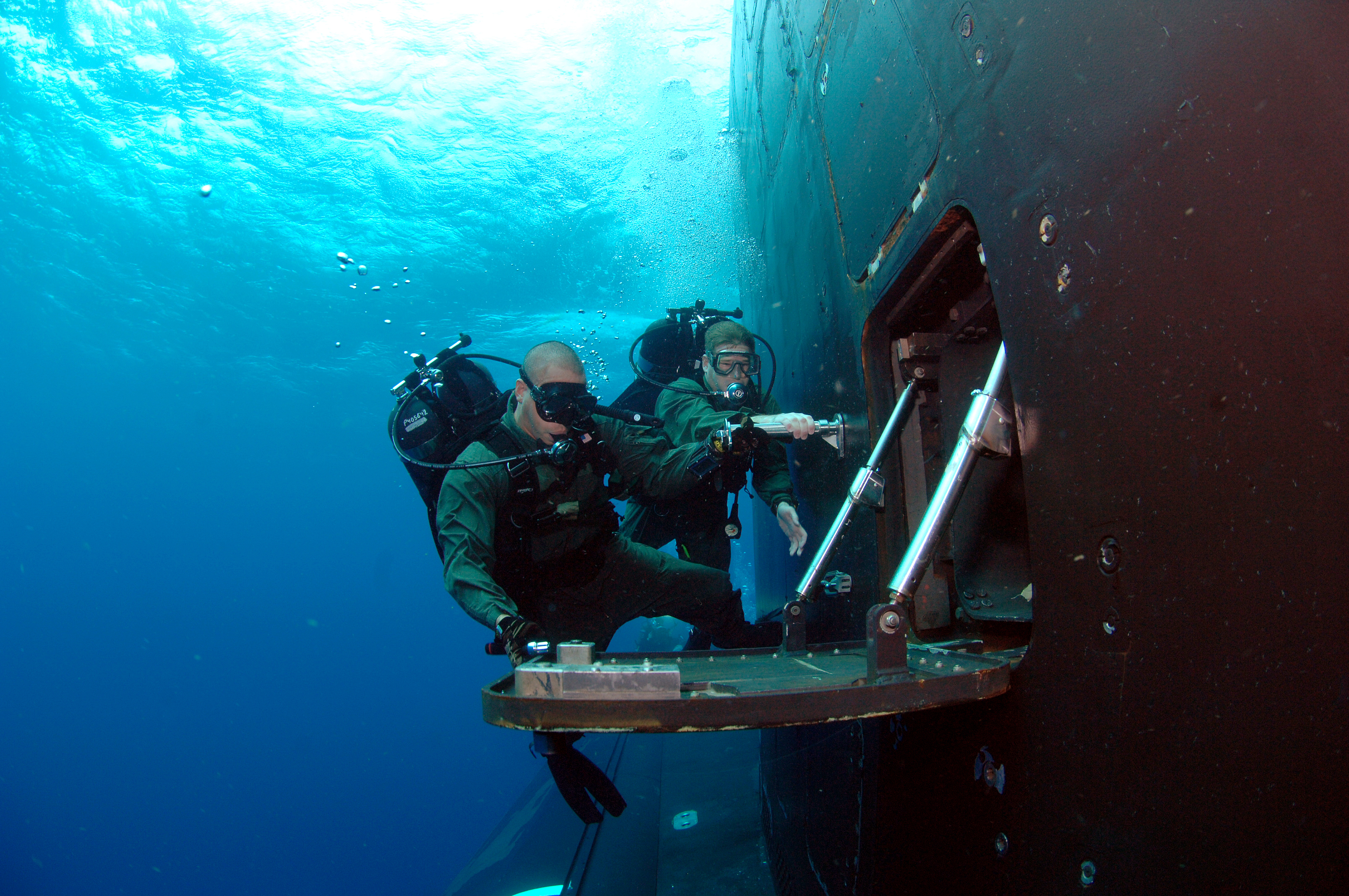
Two members of SEAL Delivery Vehicle Team 2 conduct lockout training with USS Hawaii in 2007.

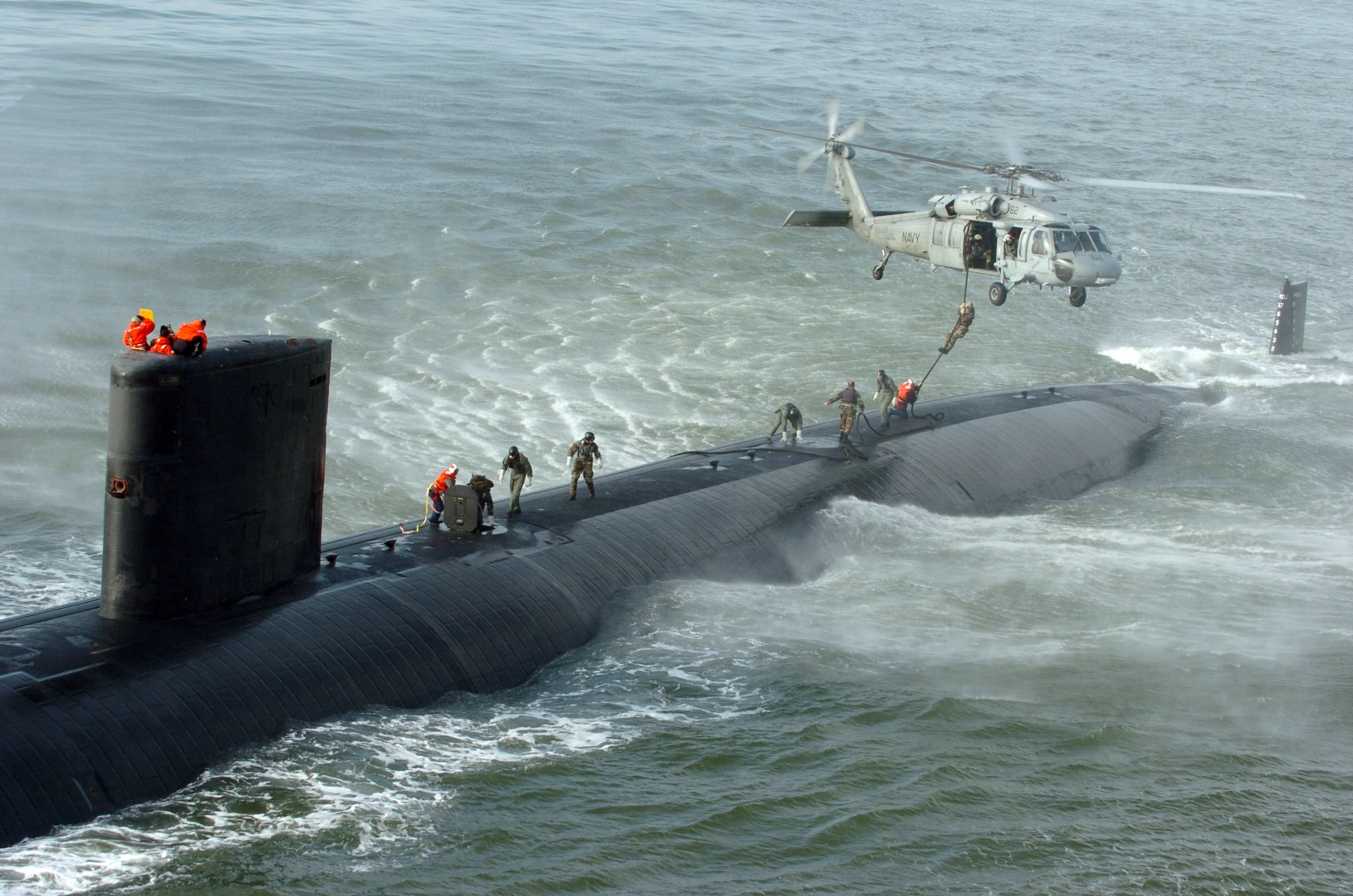
SEALs from SEAL Delivery Vehicle Team Two fast-rope to the deck of USS Toledo (2005).

The total number of personnel, including SEALs and SWCCs assigned to Naval Special Warfare Command is approximately 8,195 out of a total 8,985 military staff, and 10,166 including civilian support staff, as of 2015.

=== Naval Special Warfare Groups ===
Naval Special Warfare Command is organized into the following configuration:

- Naval Special Warfare Group 1 – based at the Naval Amphibious Base Coronado in California
  - SEAL Team 1
  - SEAL Team 3
  - SEAL Team 5
  - SEAL Team 7
  - Logistics Support Unit 1
  - Tactical Communications Command 1
- Naval Special Warfare Group 2 – based at the Joint Expeditionary Base–Little Creek in Virginia
  - SEAL Team 2
  - SEAL Team 4
  - SEAL Team 8
  - SEAL Team 10
  - Logistics Support Unit 2
  - Tactical Communications Command 2
- Naval Special Warfare Group 4 – based at the Joint Expeditionary Base Little Creek in Virginia
  - Special Boat Team 12
  - Special Boat Team 20
  - Special Boat Team 22
- Naval Special Warfare Group 8 – based at the Joint Expeditionary Base Little Creek in Virginia
  - SEAL Delivery Vehicle Team 1
  - SEAL Delivery Vehicle Team 2
  - Special Reconnaissance Team 1
  - Special Reconnaissance Team 2
  - Logistics Support 3
  - Training Detachment 3
  - Mission Support Center ("organize, train, educate, equip, deploy and sustain specialized intelligence, surveillance, reconnaissance and preparation-of-the-environment capabilities")
- Naval Special Warfare Group 11 – based at the Naval Amphibious Base Coronado in California
  - SEAL Team 17 (formerly Operational Support Team 1)
  - SEAL Team 18 (formerly Operational Support Teams 2)
- Naval Special Warfare Development Group (also known as DEVGRU or SEAL Team 6) – Based at the Dam Neck Annex, NAS Oceana, Virginia Beach, Virginia, assigned operationally to JSOC
  - Red Squadron
  - Blue Squadron
  - Gold Squadron
  - Silver Squadron
  - Black Squadron
  - Grey Squadron

Deactivated Groups:

- Naval Special Warfare Group 3 – previously based at the Naval Amphibious Base Coronado in California; deactivated in 2021
- Naval Special Warfare Group 10 – previously based at the Naval Amphibious Base Little Creek in Virginia; deactivated in 2021

=== SEAL Teams ===
The original SEAL Teams were separated between West Coast (Team One) and East Coast (Team Two) SEALs. Likewise current SEAL Teams are organized into two groups: Naval Special Warfare Group One (West Coast) and Naval Special Warfare Group Two (East Coast), both of which come under the command of Naval Special Warfare Command at NAB Coronado, California. As of 2006, there are eight confirmed Navy SEAL Teams. The current SEAL Team deployments include Teams 1, 2, 3, 4, 5, 7, 8, and 10. The most recent active-duty teams are SEAL Team 7 and SEAL Team 10, which were formed in March and April 2002, respectively. However, two reservist support teams were reorganized into SEAL teams in 2008.

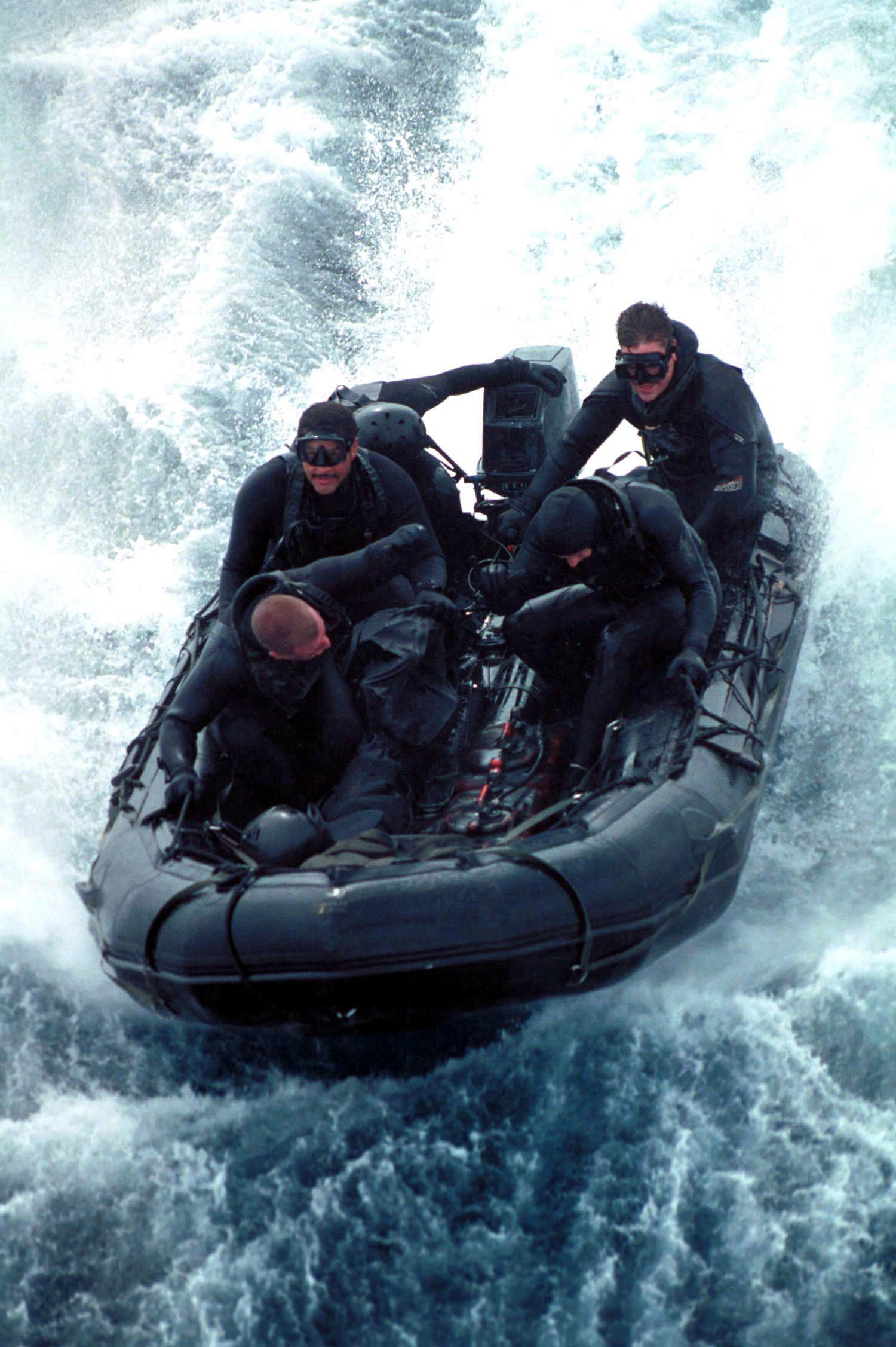
SEAL Team 5 conducts an exercise in a Combat Rubber Raiding Craft in 2000.

The Teams deploy as Naval Special Warfare Squadrons or Special Operations Task Forces and can deploy anywhere in the world. Squadrons will normally be deployed and fall under a Joint Task Force (JTF) or a Combined Joint Special Operations Task Force (CJSOTF) as a Special Operations Task Force (SOTF).

Each SEAL Team (or "squadron") is commanded by a Navy commander (O-5), and has eight operational SEAL platoons and a headquarters element. Operationally, the "Team" is divided into two to four 40-man "task units" (or "troops"). Each task unit consists of a headquarters element consisting of a task unit commander, typically a lieutenant commander (O-4), a task unit senior enlisted (E-8), a targeting/operations officer (O-2/3) and a targeting/operations leading/chief petty officer (E-6/7). Under the HQ element are two to four SEAL platoons of 16 men (two officers and 14 enlisted SEALs, and sometimes assigned non-NSW support personnel); a company-sized combat service support (CSS) and/or combat support (CS) consisting of staff N-codes (the Army and Marine Corps use S-codes); N1 Administrative support, N2 Intelligence, N3 Operations, N4 Logistics, N5 Plans and Targeting, N6 Communications, N7 Training, and N8 Air/Medical.

Each 16-man platoon can be task organized for operational purposes into two eight-man squads, four four-man fire teams, or eight two-man sniper/reconnaissance teams. The size of each SEAL "Team", or "squadron", with two to four task units (containing a total of eight platoons) and support staff is approximately 300 personnel. The typical SEAL platoon has an OIC (officer in charge), usually a lieutenant (O-3), a platoon chief (E-7/E-8), and two squads commanded by a LTJG (O-2) and a squad leader (E-6). The remaining members of the squad are operators (E-4 to E-6) with their specialty skills in ordnance, communications, diving, and medical. The core leadership in the troop and platoon are the commander/OIC and the senior enlisted NCO (Senior Chief/chief).

Platoon core skills consist of: Sniper, Breacher, Communicator, Maritime/Engineering, Close Air Support, Corpsman, Point-man/Navigator, Primary Driver/Navigator (Rural/Urban/Protective Security), Heavy Weapons Operator, Sensitive Site Exploitation, Air Operations Master, Lead Climber, Lead Diver/Navigator, Interrogator, Explosive Ordnance Disposal, Technical Surveillance, and Advanced Special Operations.

Naval Amphibious Base Little Creek, a naval base in Virginia Beach, Virginia, is home to SEAL Teams 2, 4, 8, 10, and 18. Naval Amphibious Base Coronado, a naval base in Coronado, California, is home to SEAL Teams 1, 3, 5, 7, and 17. There are also two SEAL Delivery Vehicle (SDV) units, SDVT-1 and SDVT-2, located in Pearl Harbor, Hawaii, and Little Creek, Virginia, respectively. SDV Teams are SEAL teams with an added underwater delivery capability. An SDV platoon consists of 12–15 SEALs.

Insignia	Team	Deployment	Number of platoons	HQ	Notes
	SEAL Team 1	Worldwide	8 platoons	Coronado, California	Established in 1962 as a separate component within the Underwater Demolition Units.
	SEAL Team 2	Worldwide	8 platoons	Virginia Beach, Virginia	Established in 1962 as a separate component within the Underwater Demolition Units.
	SEAL Team 3	Middle East	8 platoons	Coronado, California	
	SEAL Team 4	Worldwide	8 platoons	Virginia Beach, Virginia	On 1 May 1983, Underwater Demolition Team – 21 was redesignated as SEAL Team FOUR.
	SEAL Team 5	Worldwide	8 platoons	Coronado, California	On 1 May 1983, Underwater Demolition Team - 11 redesignated as SEAL Team 5.
	Naval Special Warfare Development Group (SEAL Team 6)	Worldwide	Classified	Virginia Beach, Virginia	SEAL Team 6 was dissolved in 1987. The Navy then established the Naval Special Warfare Development Group, also known as DEVGRU. While DEVGRU is administratively supported by Naval Special Warfare Command, they are operationally under the command of the Joint Special Operations Command.
SEAL Team 7	SEAL Team 7	Worldwide	8 platoons	Coronado, California	
	SEAL Team 8	Worldwide	8 platoons	Virginia Beach, Virginia	
	SEAL Team 10	Middle East	8 platoons	Virginia Beach, Virginia	
	SEAL Team 17	Worldwide; Reserve	2 platoons	Coronado, California	Formerly Operational Support Team 1
	SEAL Team 18	Worldwide; Reserve	2 platoons	Virginia Beach, Virginia	Formerly Operational Support Team 2
	SEAL Delivery Vehicle Team 1	Indian and Pacific Oceans, Middle East	4 platoons	Pearl Harbor, Hawaii	On 1 May 1983, Underwater Demolition Team – 12 was redesignated as SDVT–1.
	SEAL Delivery Vehicle Team 2	Atlantic Ocean, Europe and the Americas	4 platoons	Virginia Beach, Virginia	On 1 May 1983, Underwater Demolition Team – 22 was redesignated as SDVT–2.

=== Special warfare ratings ===
The Special Warfare Operator rating (SO) and Special Warfare Boat Operator rating (SB), were established in 2006. Special Warfare Operators (SEALs) and Special Warfare Boat Operators (SWCCs) are no longer required to maintain the original rating they qualified in upon joining the Navy.

The following ratings are specific to Navy SEALs:

Navy rating	Abbreviation	Pay grade	Special warfare rating	Abbreviation	Rank insignia
Master chief petty officer	MCPO	E-9	Master chief special warfare operator	SOCM	
Senior chief petty officer	SCPO	E-8	Senior chief special warfare operator	SOCS	
Chief petty officer	CPO	E-7	Chief special warfare operator	SOC	
Petty officer first class	PO1	E-6	Special warfare operator, first class	SO1	
Petty officer second class	PO2	E-5	Special warfare operator, second class	SO2	
Petty officer third class	PO3	E-4	Special warfare operator, third class	SO3	

== United States Navy Parachute Team "Leap Frogs" ==
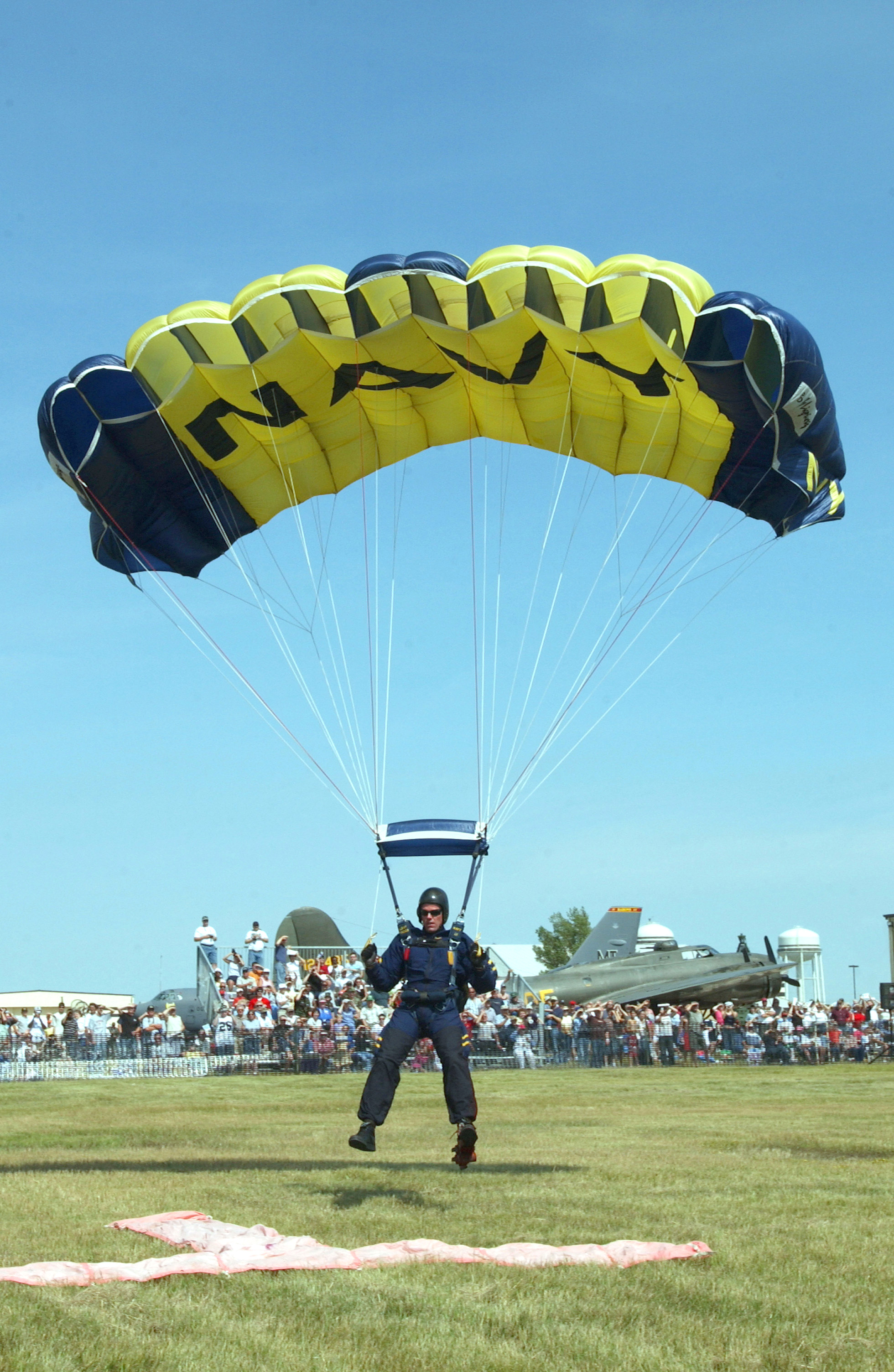
A member of the U.S. Navy Parachute Demonstration Team, the "Leap Frogs", returns to Earth after a successful jump.

The primary mission of the Navy Parachute Team (NPT) is to support Naval Special Warfare recruiting by gaining access and exposure to appropriate candidates through aerial parachuting demonstrations. The U.S. Navy Parachute Team is a fifteen-man team composed of U.S. Navy SEALs. Each member comes to the team for a three-year tour from one of the two Naval Special Warfare Groups located on the east and west coasts. On completion of the tour, members return to operational units. The parachute team began in 1969 when Navy SEALs and Frogmen volunteered to perform at weekend air shows. The Team initially consisted of five jumpers: LCDR Olson, PHC Gagliardi, SK2 "Herky" Hertenstein, PR1 Al Schmiz and PH2 "Chip" Maury. Schmiz and Maury were members of the original "Chuting Stars." When LCDR Olson was transferred to California, PHC Gene "Gag" Gagliardi (D 546) of UDT Eleven introduced him to the local jumping elite with the San Diego Skydivers, one of the nation's first sports parachuting clubs. He convinced the Commander Naval Operations Support Group, PACIFIC to create a small demonstration team consisting of a cadre of highly qualified freefall jumpers. Its activities were to be conducted on a "not to interfere" basis with other military duties and at no cost to the government, other than utilizing normally scheduled aircraft. This group eventually adopted the "Leap Frogs" name.

The team was officially commissioned as the U.S. Navy Parachute Team in 1974 by the Chief of Naval Operations and assigned the mission of demonstrating Navy excellence throughout the United States. The East Coast-based "Chuting Stars" were disbanded in the 1980s with the "Leap Frogs" taking on all official parachute demonstrations within the Navy.

A typical Leap Frogs' performance consists of six jumpers leaping out of an aircraft at an altitude of 6,000 feet. After freefalling sometimes using smoke or streamers, the Leap Frogs fly their canopies together to build canopy-relative work formations. After performances, the Leap Frogs make themselves available to the public to answer questions about the Navy and the Naval Special Warfare community, as well as to sign autographs.

== Influence on foreign units ==
US Navy SEALs and GROM — Polish naval warfare team members — practicing boarding skills near Gdansk, Poland, 2009

From its predecessors, the Underwater Demolition Teams, to its current form, the SEALs have influenced the training and formation of several foreign units. In 1955, the Underwater Demolition Teams provided funding and training for the Republic of Korea Naval Special Warfare Flotilla, who are also known as UDT/SEALs. This was followed in 1956 by providing funding, training and formation of the Philippine Navy Underwater Operations Team (UOT), patterned on the training and implementation of the US Navy SEALs and the UDTs. In 1966, United States Navy SEALs established Pakistan's Special Service Group based on a mutual security understanding and the training provided under the IMET program until the 1970s. U.S. Navy SEALs provided initial training to the Indian Marine Special Force, which later became known as the MARCOS.

Due to their reputation as being one of America's premier special operations forces, SEALs (particularly operators from DEVGRU) will often do exchanges with allied SOFs.

== National Navy UDT-SEAL Museum and memorial ==
The National Navy UDT-SEAL Museum, in Fort Pierce, Florida, was founded in 1985 and was recognized as a National Museum by an act of Congress. The museum is dedicated to preserving the history of the Navy SEALs and their predecessors. The SEAL Museum stands on the training site of the first Navy frogmen. There through World War II, thousands of service members were trained as members of Naval Combat Demolition Units and Underwater Demolition Teams. The Museum houses rare historical artifacts from the founding of the UDT to present day, including weapons, vehicles, equipment, and most recently added, the Maersk Alabama lifeboat aboard which Somali pirates held Captain Richard Phillips hostage.

=== Navy SEAL Memorial ===
According to the Navy SEAL Museum, 298 UDT and SEALs were killed in action and died during training accidents as of March 2018:

- World War II and the Korean War (1941–1953):
  - 96 personnel
- Vietnam and the Cold War (1954–1989):
  - 104 personnel
- Desert Storm and the war on terror (1990 – March 2018):
  - 98 personnel

== Gallery ==
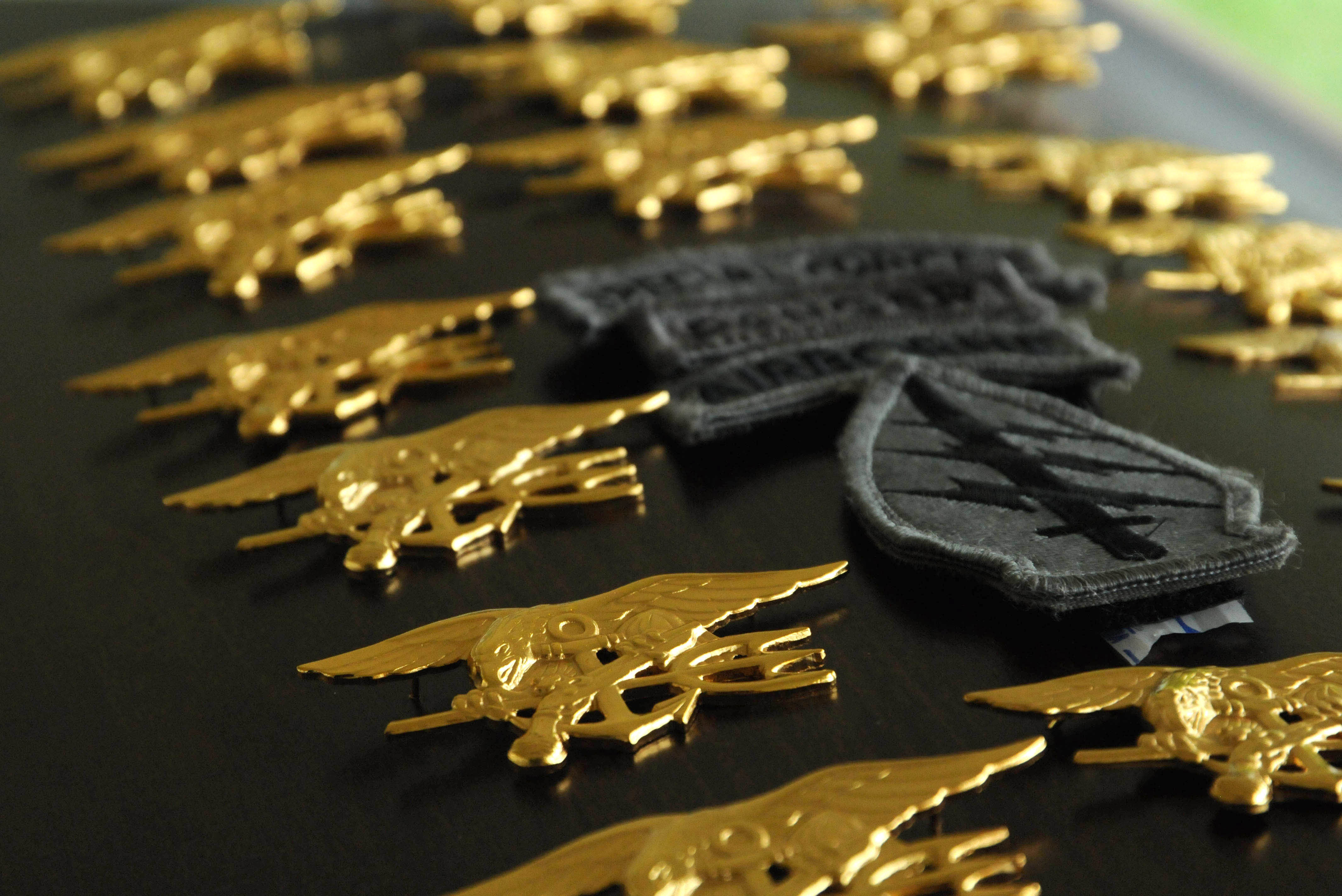
SEAL Tridents

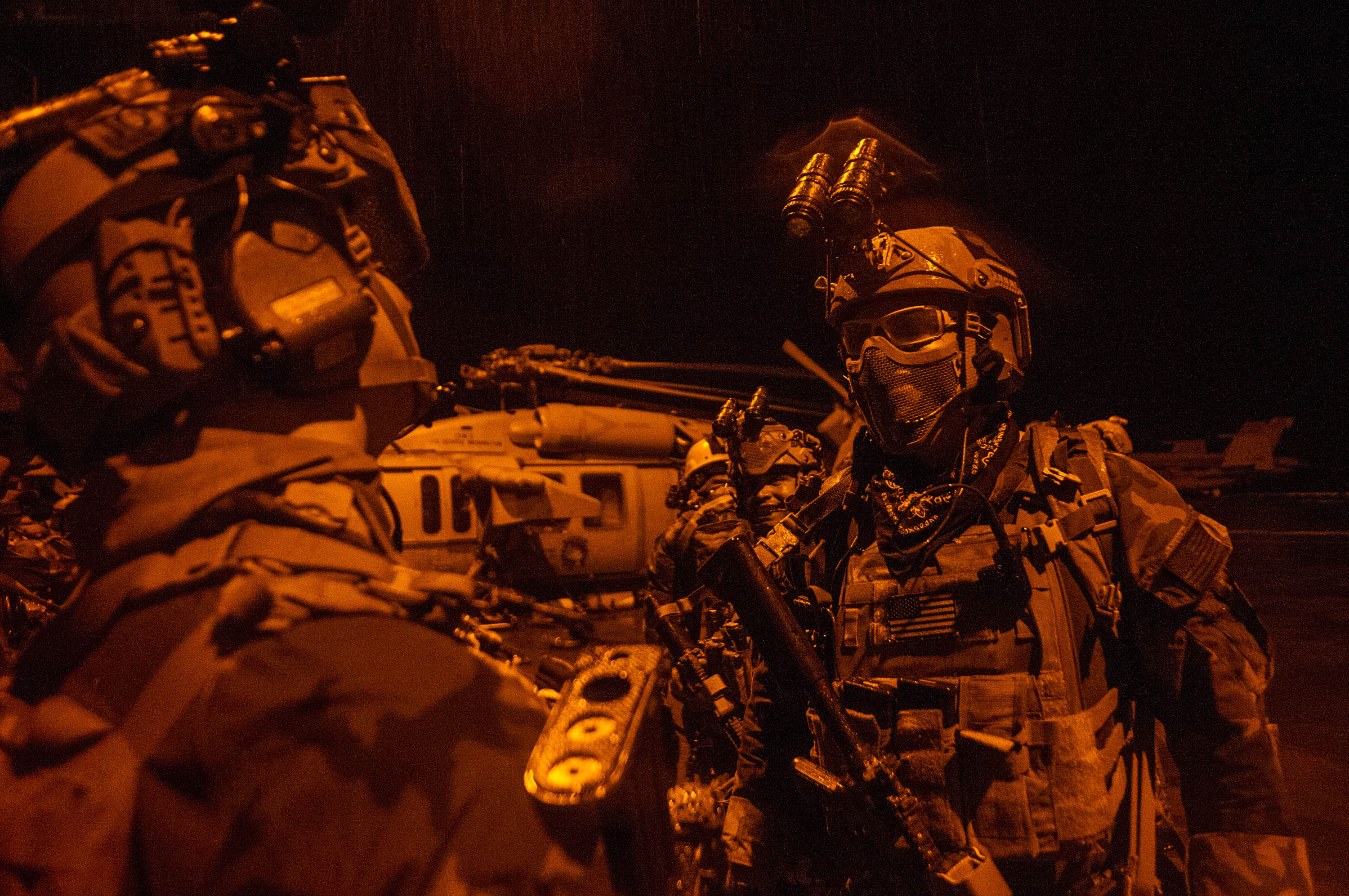
SEALs prepare for a training mission aboard the USS George Washington.

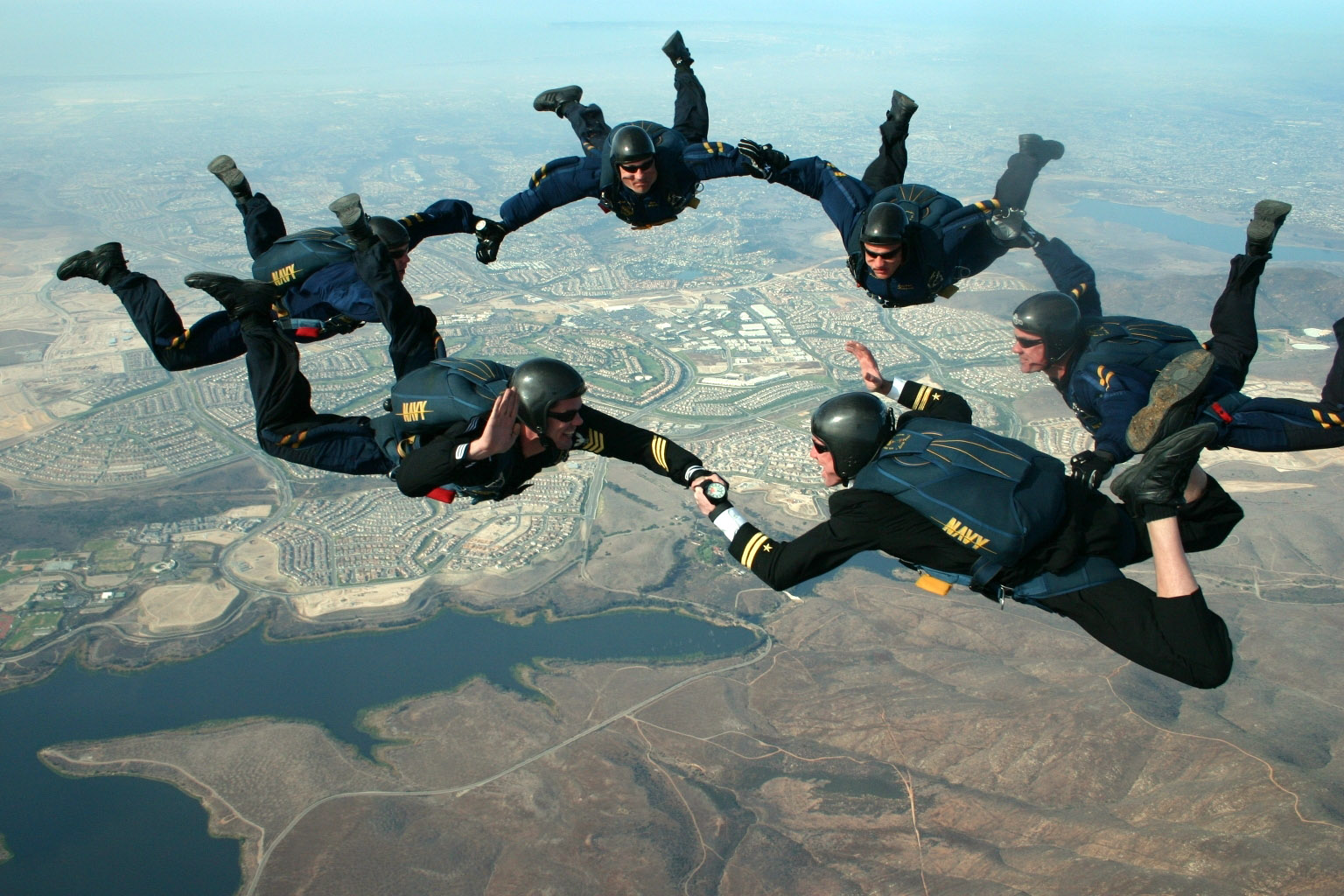
A SEAL "Leap Frogs" parachute team high above San Diego

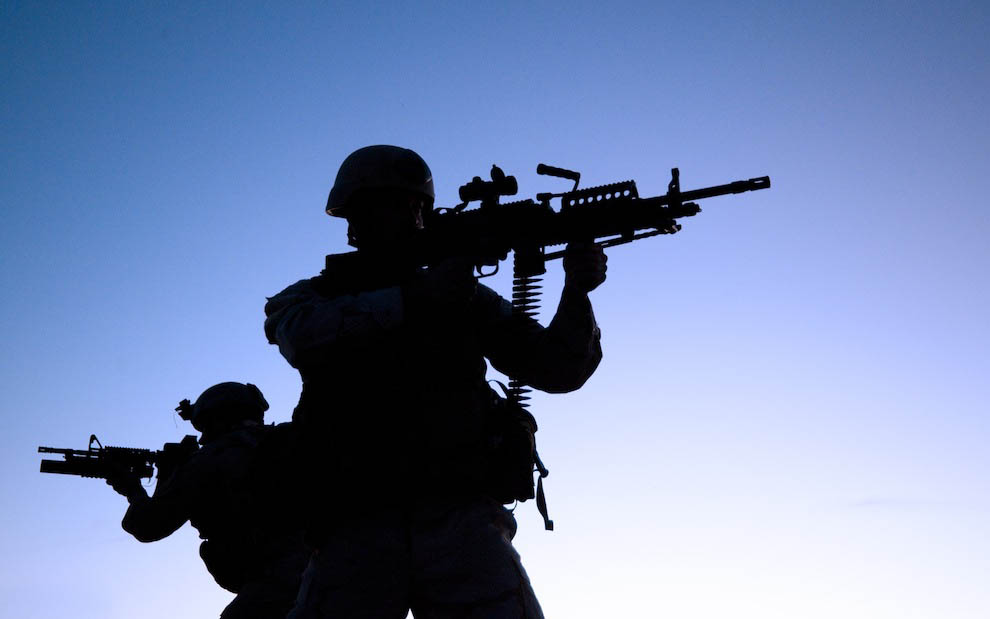
Two SEALs aiming their weapons

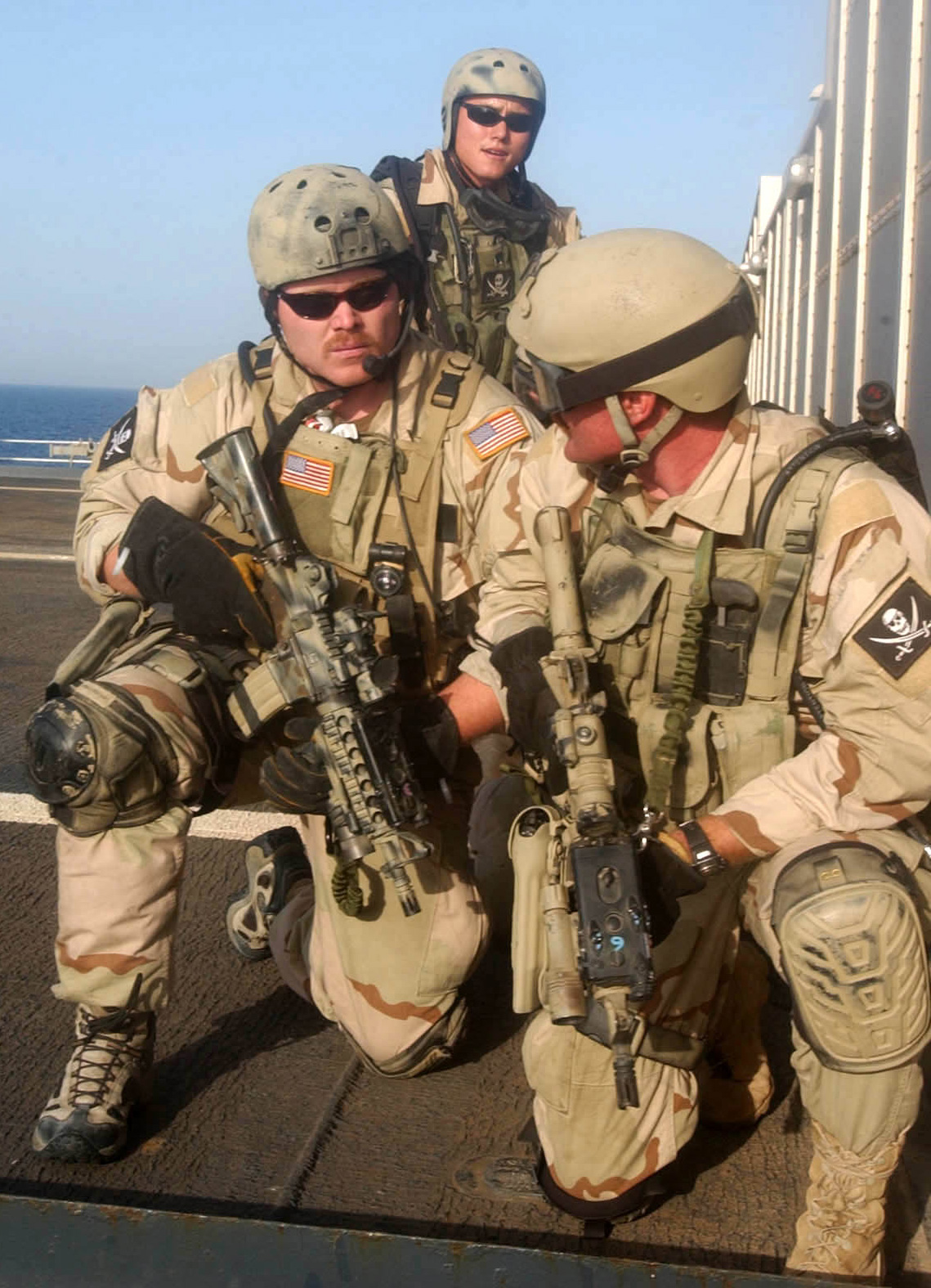
SEALs during a VBSS training in support of Operation Iraqi Freedom

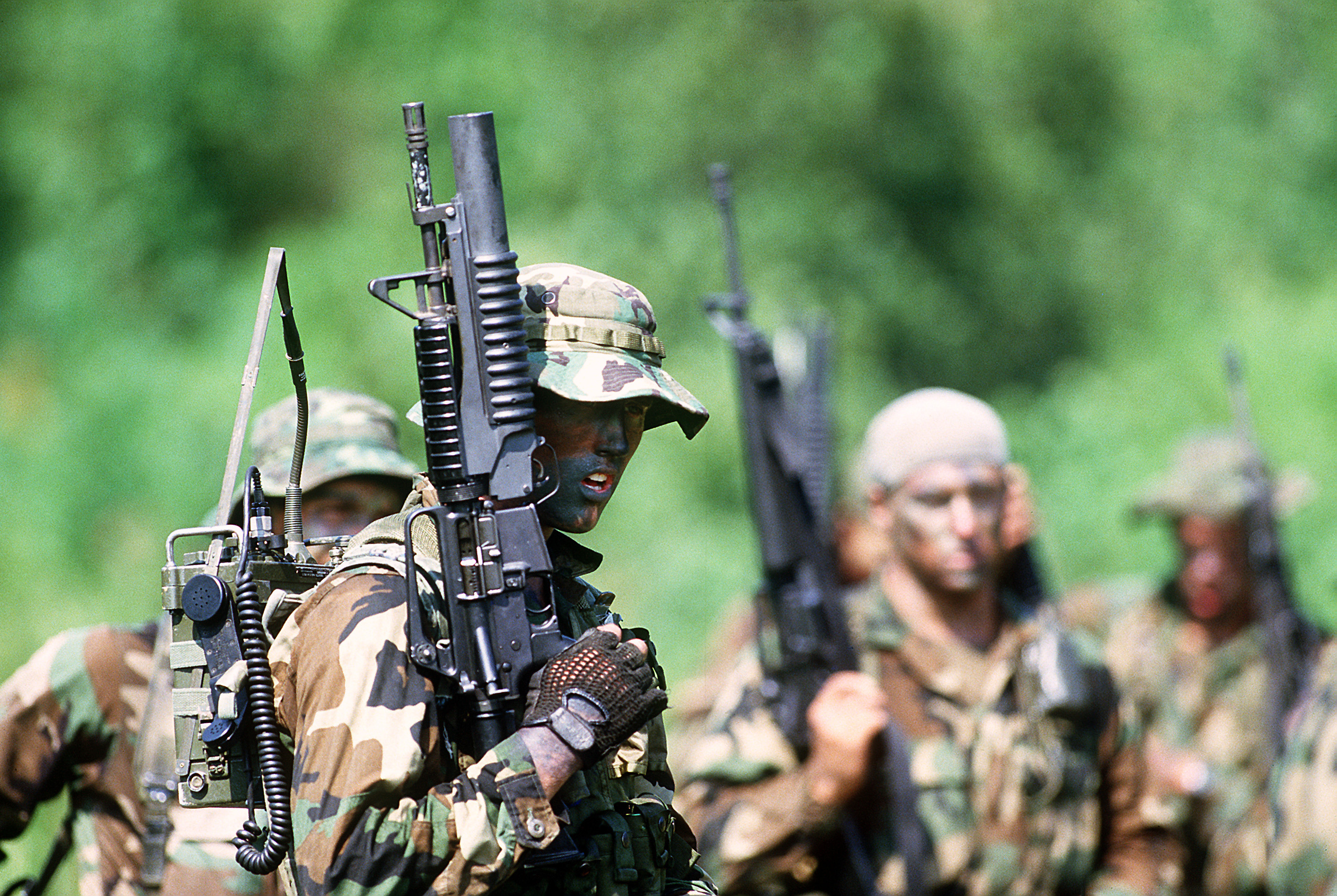
SEAL team members participate in a tactical warfare training.

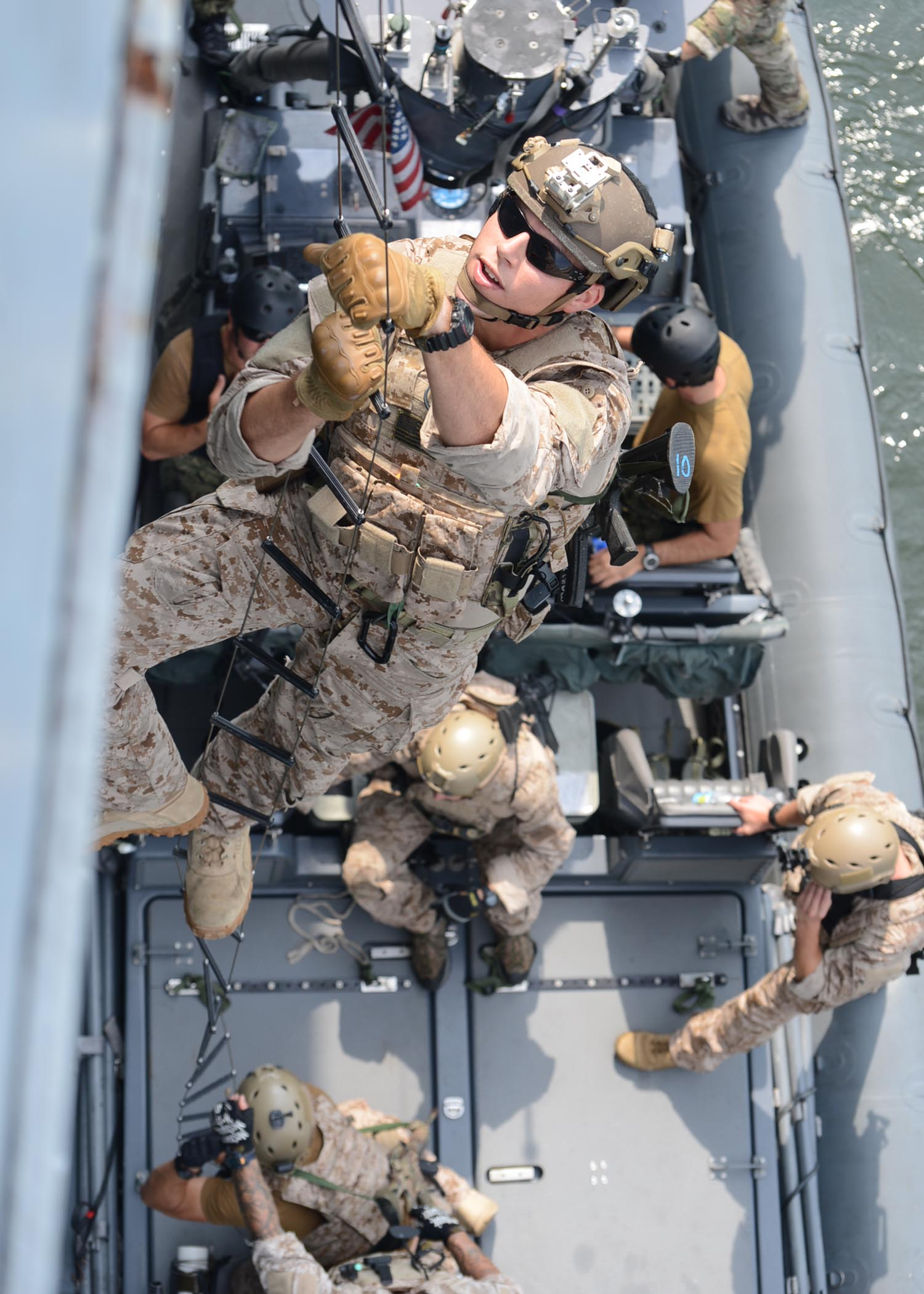
SEALs climb a caving ladder during a VBSS training.

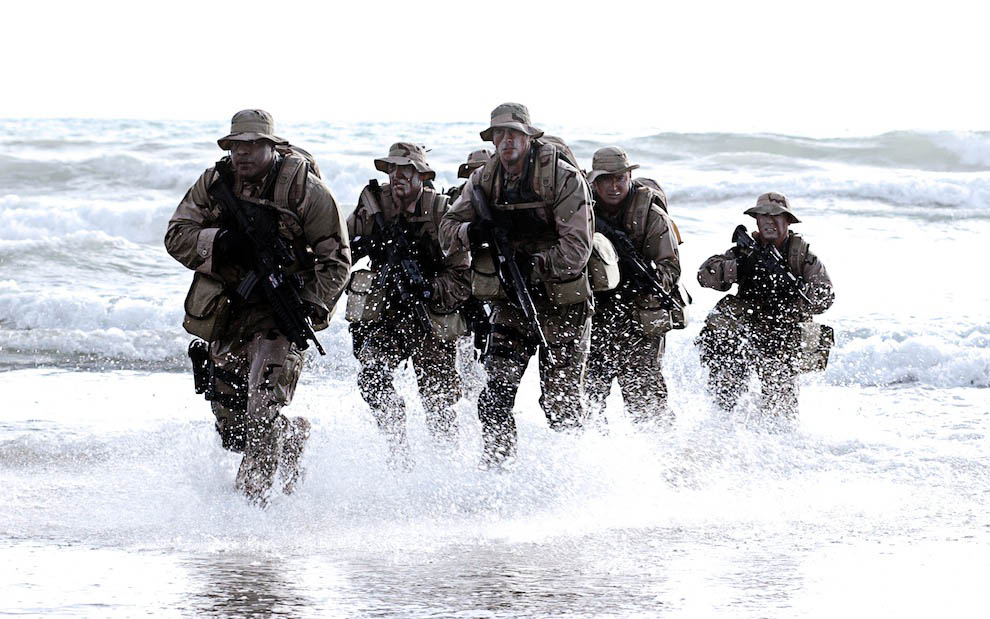
A SEAL Team coming out of water

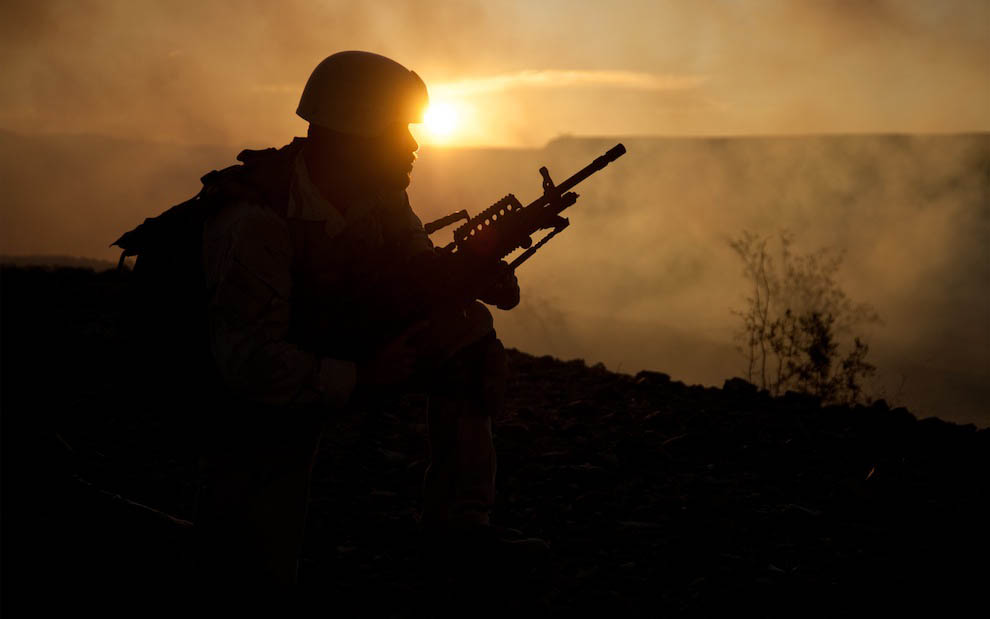
A SEAL at sunset

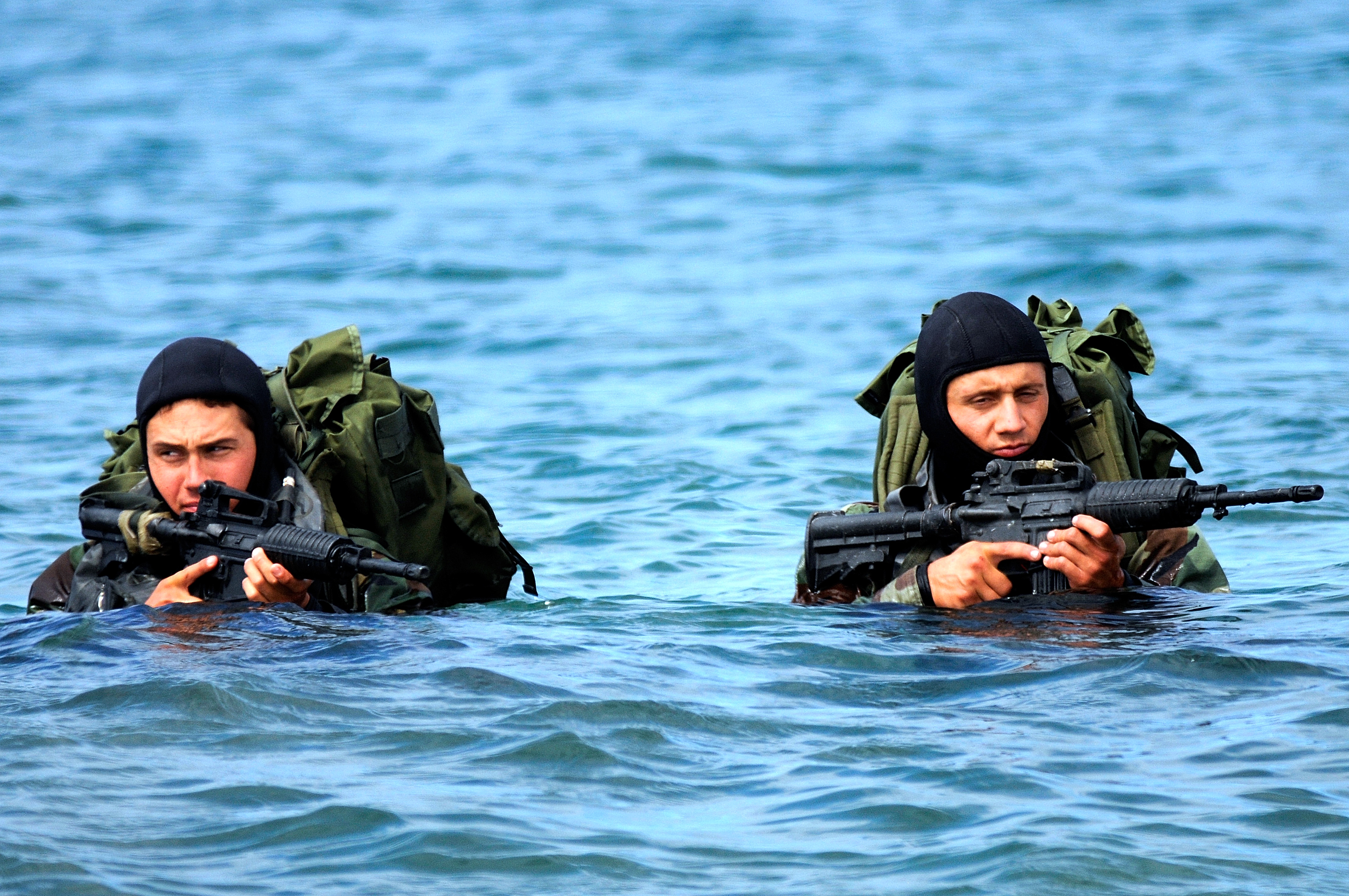
US Navy Basic Underwater Demolition-SEAL (BUD-S) students wade ashore on an Island during an exercise.

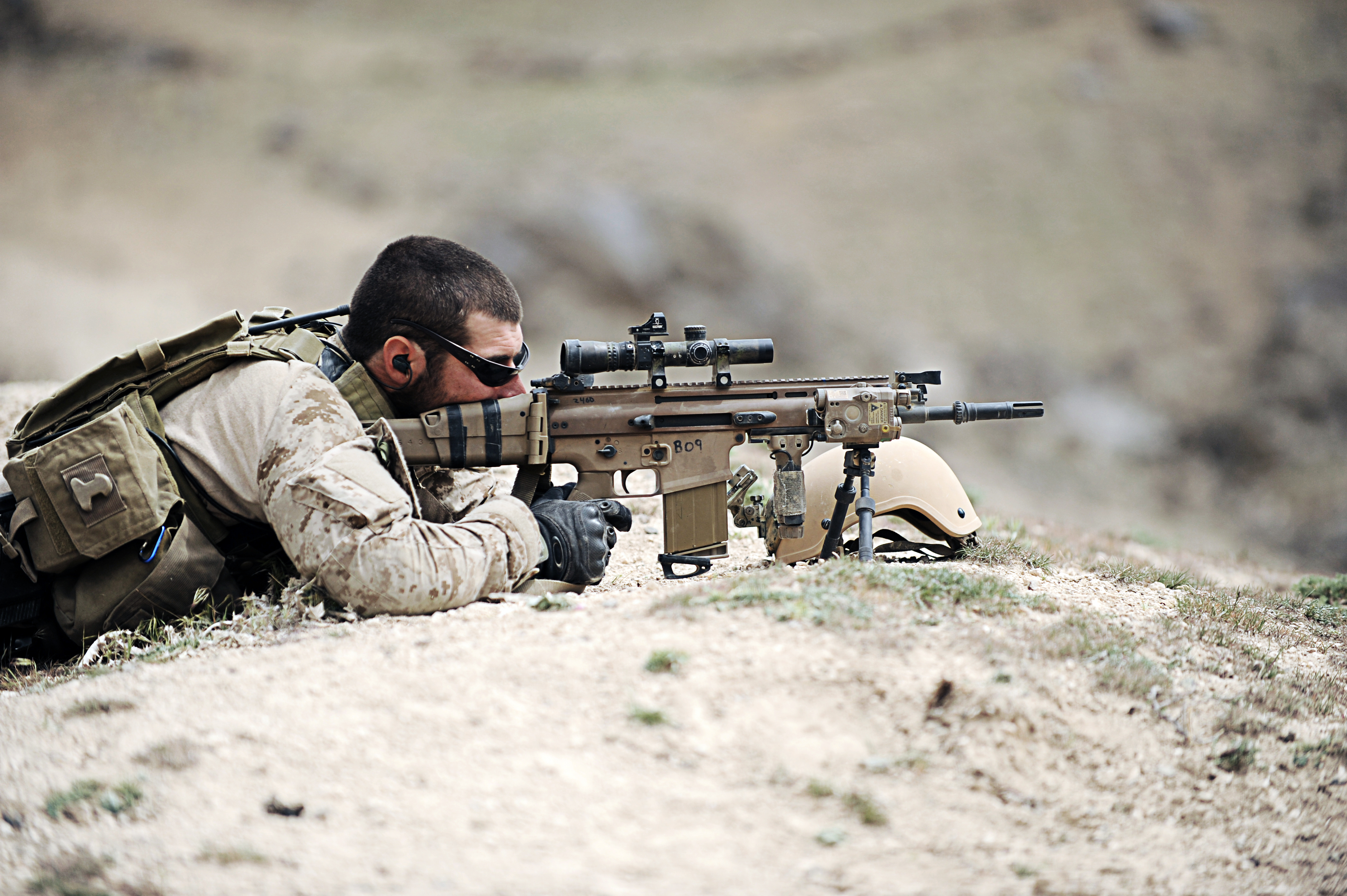
A SEAL takes up a defensive position in a village in northern Zabul province, Afghanistan, 10 April 2010.

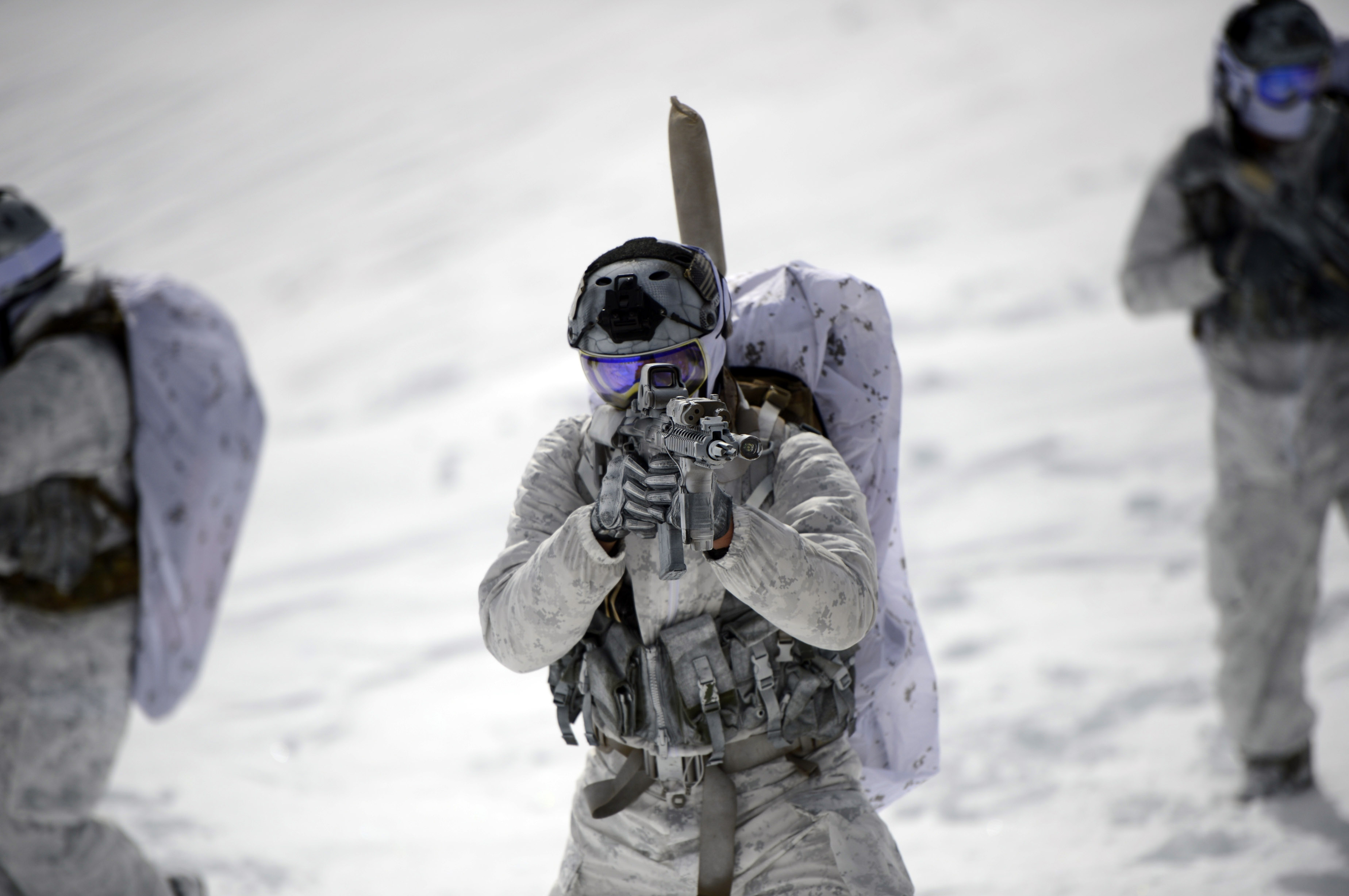
SEALs demonstrate winter warfare capabilities.

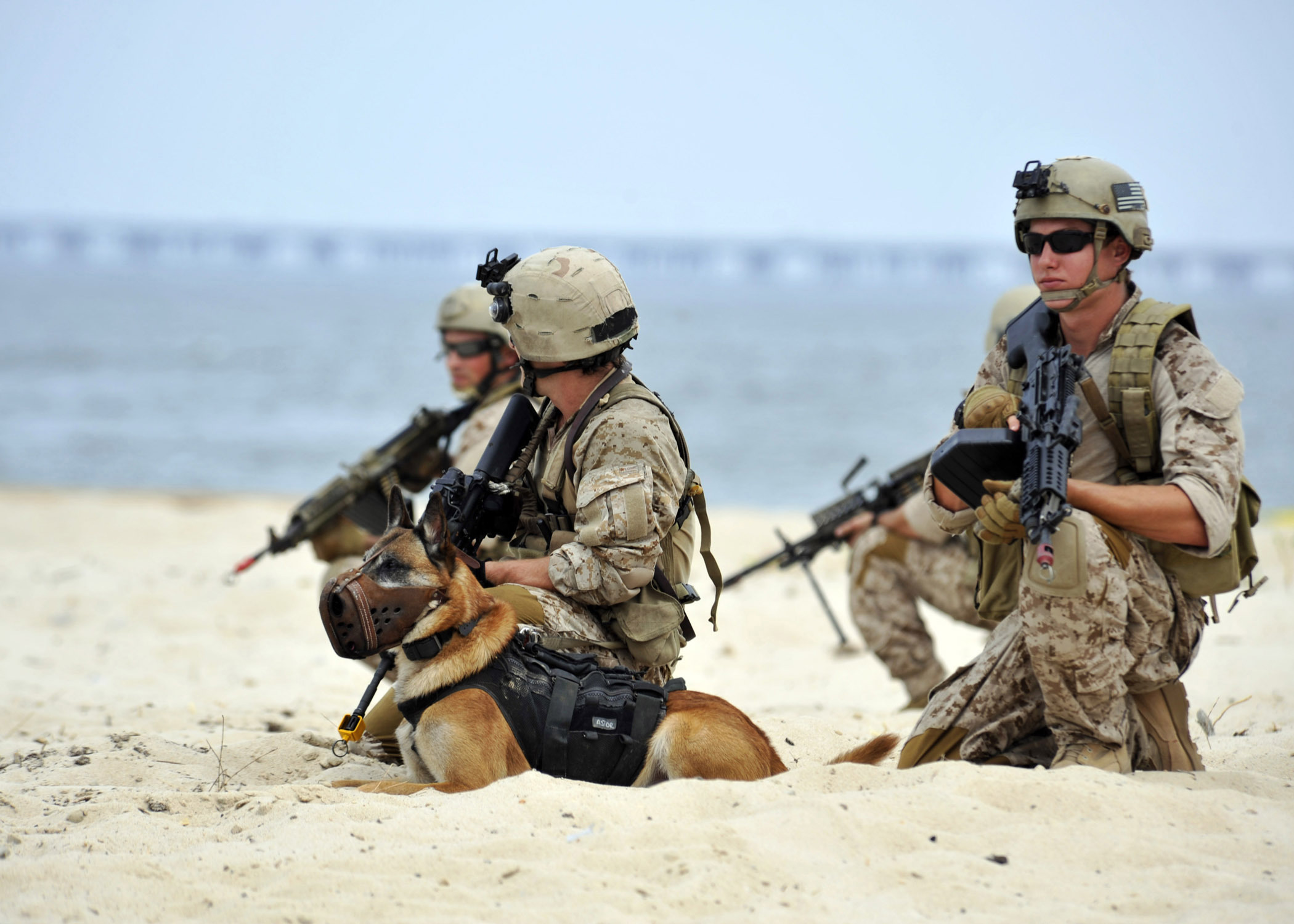
A SEAL platoon performs a land warfare demonstration.

== See also ==
- SEAL Team Six, a.k.a. Naval Special Warfare Development Group — one of the five premier special mission units of the U.S. Armed Forces, composed solely of Navy SEALs
- Special warfare combatant-craft crewmen
- Special amphibious reconnaissance corpsman – Hospital corpsman in the US Navy
- List of United States Navy SEALs – Notable members of the US Navy SEALs and UDTs
- List of military special forces units – Compilation of world's military special forces
- SEAL Team (TV series)

== Bibliography ==
- Besel, Jennifer M. The Navy SEALs. Mankato, Minn: Capstone Press, 2011. ISBN 1429653809. OCLC 649079630.
- Bosiljevac, T. L. SEALs: UDT/SEAL Operations in Vietnam. Ballantine Books, 1990. ISBN 080410722X. OCLC 23228772.
- Bosiljevac, T. L. SEAL Team Roll-Back. New York: Avon Books, 1999. ISBN 0380787148. OCLC 41020614.
- Bahmanyar, Mir. US Navy SEALs. Oxford: Osprey Publishing, 2005. ISBN 1841768073. OCLC 62176513.
- Bahmanyar, Mir with Chris Osman. SEALs: The US Navy's Elite Fighting Force. Osprey Publishing, 2008. ISBN 1846032261. OCLC 191922842.
- Cawthorne, Nigel (2008). The Mammoth Book of Inside the Elite Forces. London: Robinson. ISBN 978-1845298210.
- Couch, Dick. May the Seals: Their untold history (2014)
- Couch, Dick (2008). The Sheriff of Ramadi: Navy SEALs and the Winning of al-Anbar. Annapolis, Maryland: Naval Institute Press. ISBN 978-1591141389.
- Couch, Dick. The Warrior Elite: The Forging of SEAL Class 228. New York: Three Rivers Press, 2003. ISBN 1400046955. OCLC 802957824.
- Couch, Dick. The Finishing School: Earning the Navy SEAL Trident. New York: Three Rivers Press, 2004. ISBN 0609810464. OCLC 60563833.
- Couch, Dick. Down Range: Navy SEALs in the War on Terrorism. New York: Three Rivers Press, 2005. ISBN 1400081017. OCLC 71199069.
- Cummings, Dennis J. The Men Behind the Trident: SEAL Team One in Viet Nam. New York: Bantam Books, 1998. ISBN 0553579282. OCLC 39494815.
- Denver, Rorke, and Ellis Henican. Damn Few: Making the Modern SEAL Warrior. New York: Hyperion, 2013. ISBN 1401312802. OCLC 795757181.
- Dockery, Kevin. Navy SEALs: A History of the Early Years. New York: Berkley Books, 2001. ISBN 0425178250. OCLC 0425178250.
- Dockery, Kevin. Navy SEALs: A History Part II: The Vietnam Years. New York: Berkley Books, 2002. ISBN 0425183483. OCLC 48449554.
- Dockery, Kevin. Navy SEALs: A History Part III: Post-Vietnam to the Present. New York: Berkley Books, 2003. ISBN 042519034X. OCLC 51818673.
- Dockery, Kevin. Weapons of the Navy SEALs. New York: Berkley Books, 2004. ISBN 0425198340. OCLC 56347561.
- Donald, Mark L., and Scott Mactavish. Battle Ready: Memoir of a SEAL Warrior Medic. New York: St. Martin's Press, 2013. ISBN 1250009766. OCLC 759914152.
- Fawcett, Bill. Hunters and Shooters: An Oral History of the U.S. Navy SEALs in Vietnam. New York: W. Morrow and Co., 1995. ISBN 0688126642. OCLC 31520013.
- Freid-Perenchio, Stephanie, and Jennifer Walton. SEAL: The Unspoken Sacrifice. [Ketchum, ID]: SFP Studio, 2009. ISBN 0615303226. OCLC 525383689.
- Greitens, Eric. The Heart and the Fist: The Education of a Humanitarian, the Making of a Navy SEAL. Boston: Houghton Mifflin Harcourt, 2011. ISBN 054742485X. OCLC 646308409.
- Halberstadt, Hans. US Navy SEALs in Action. Osceola, WI: Motorbooks International, 1995. ISBN 0879389931. OCLC 32275764.
- Jansing, Chris (29 January 2010). "A typical SEAL? Think 007, not Rambo". NBC Field Notes (NBC News). Archived from the original on 31 January 2010.
- Kelly, Orr. Never Fight Fair!: Navy SEALs' Stories of Combat and Adventure. Novato, CA: Presidio Press, 1995. ISBN 089141519X. OCLC 30894438.
- Kyle, Chris (2013). American Sniper. New York: HarperCollins. ISBN 978-0062082350.
- Luttrell, Marcus. Lone Survivor: The Eyewitness Account of Operation Redwing and the Lost Heroes of SEAL Team 10. Little, Brown and Company, 2009. ISBN 0316044695. OCLC 319610219.
- Luttrell, Marcus., and James D. Hornfischer. Service: A Navy SEAL at War. New York: Little, Brown and Co., 2012. ISBN 0316185361. OCLC 756584153.
- Mann, Don, and Ralph Pezzullo. Inside SEAL Team Six: My Life and Missions with America's Elite Warriors. New York: Little, Brown & Co., 2011. ISBN 0316204315. OCLC 729343843.
- McEwen, Scott, and Richard Miniter. Eyes on Target: Inside Stories from the Brotherhood of the U.S. Navy SEALs. New York: Center Street, 2014. ISBN 1455575690. OCLC 828891431.
- Neville, Leigh (2015). Special Forces in the War on Terror. Oxford: Osprey Publishing. ISBN 978-1472807908.
- Neville, Leigh. Takur Ghar: The SEALs and Rangers on Roberts Ridge, Afghanistan 2002. Oxford, UK: Osprey Pub., 2013. ISBN 1780961987. OCLC 798058824.
- O'Donnell, Patrick K. First SEALs: The Untold Story of the Forging of America's Most Elite Unit (Da Capo, 2014) online review
- Owen, Mark, and Kevin Maurer. No Easy Day: The Autobiography of s Navy SEAL: the Firsthand Account of the Mission That Killed Osama Bin Laden. New York: Dutton, 2012. ISBN 0525953728. OCLC 808121503.
- Padden, Ian. U.S. Navy SEALs. Toronto: Bantam Books, 1985. ISBN 0553249541. OCLC 12264420.
- Pfarrer, Chuck. SEAL Target Geronimo: The Inside Story of the Mission to Kill Osama Bin Laden. New York: St. Martin's Press, 2011. ISBN 125000635X. OCLC 733234790.
- Pfarrer, Chuck. Warrior Soul: The Memoir of a Navy SEAL. New York: Random House, 2004. ISBN 1400060362. OCLC 52165997.
- Redman, Jason, and John R. Bruning. The Trident: The Forging and Reforging of a Navy SEAL Leader. New York: William Morrow, 2013. ISBN 0062208322. OCLC 827260093.
- Robinson, Patrick. Honor and Betrayal: The Untold Story of the Navy SEALs Who Captured the "Butcher of Fallujah"- and the Shameful Ordeal They Later Endured. Cambridge, Massachusetts: Da Capo Press, 2013. ISBN 030682308X. OCLC 861508106.
- Rossiter, Mike (2009). Target Basra. London: Corgi. ISBN 978-0552157001.
- Sasser, Charles W. Encyclopedia of the Navy SEALs. New York: Facts on File, 2002. ISBN 0816045690. OCLC 48383497.
- Wasdin, Howard E., and Stephen Templin. SEAL Team Six: Memoirs of an Elite Navy SEAL Sniper. New York: St. Martin's Press, 2011. ISBN 031269945X. OCLC 681499659.
