= List of active United States military watercraft =

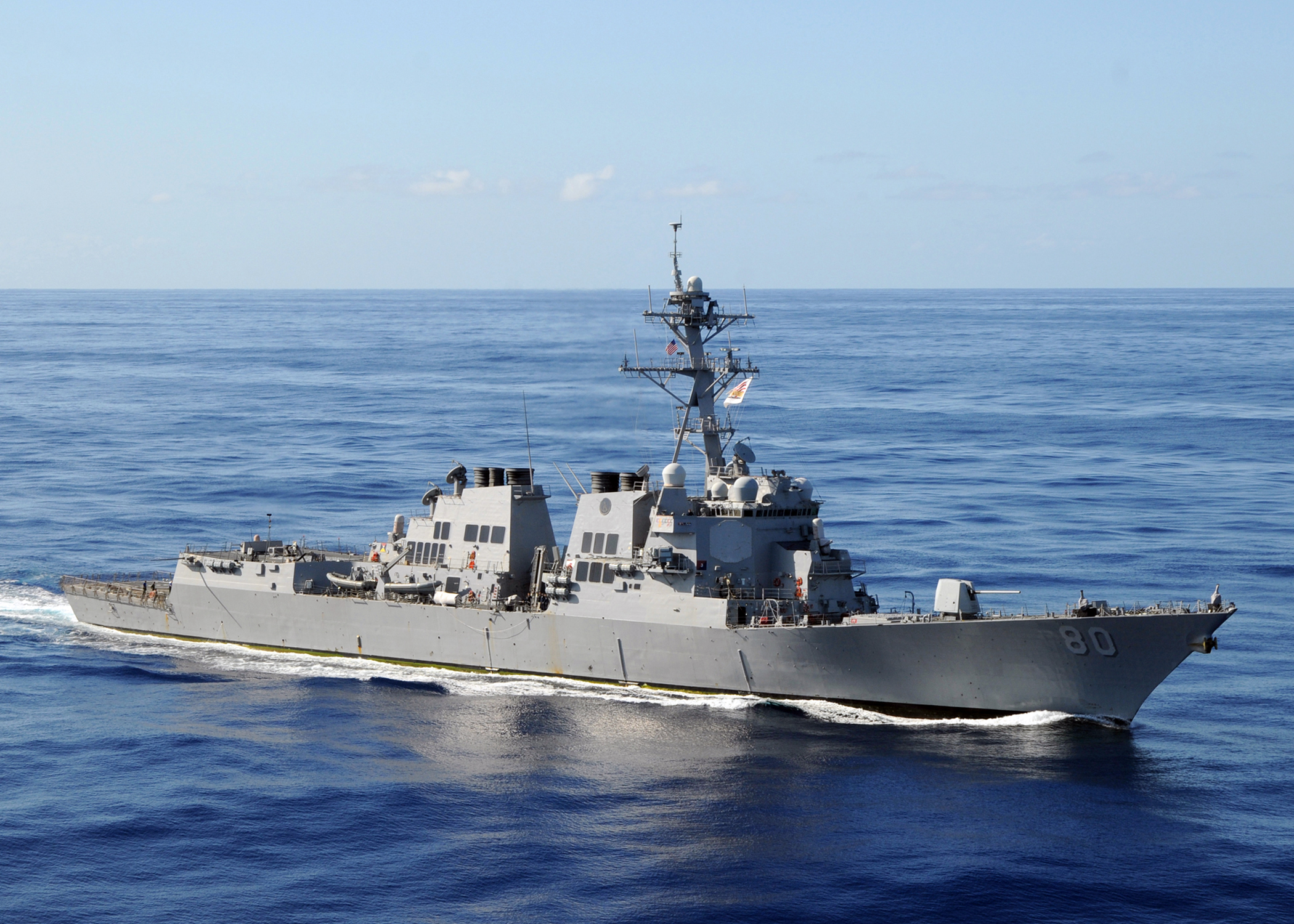
USS Roosevelt (DDG-80), U.S. Navy Arleigh Burke-class destroyer

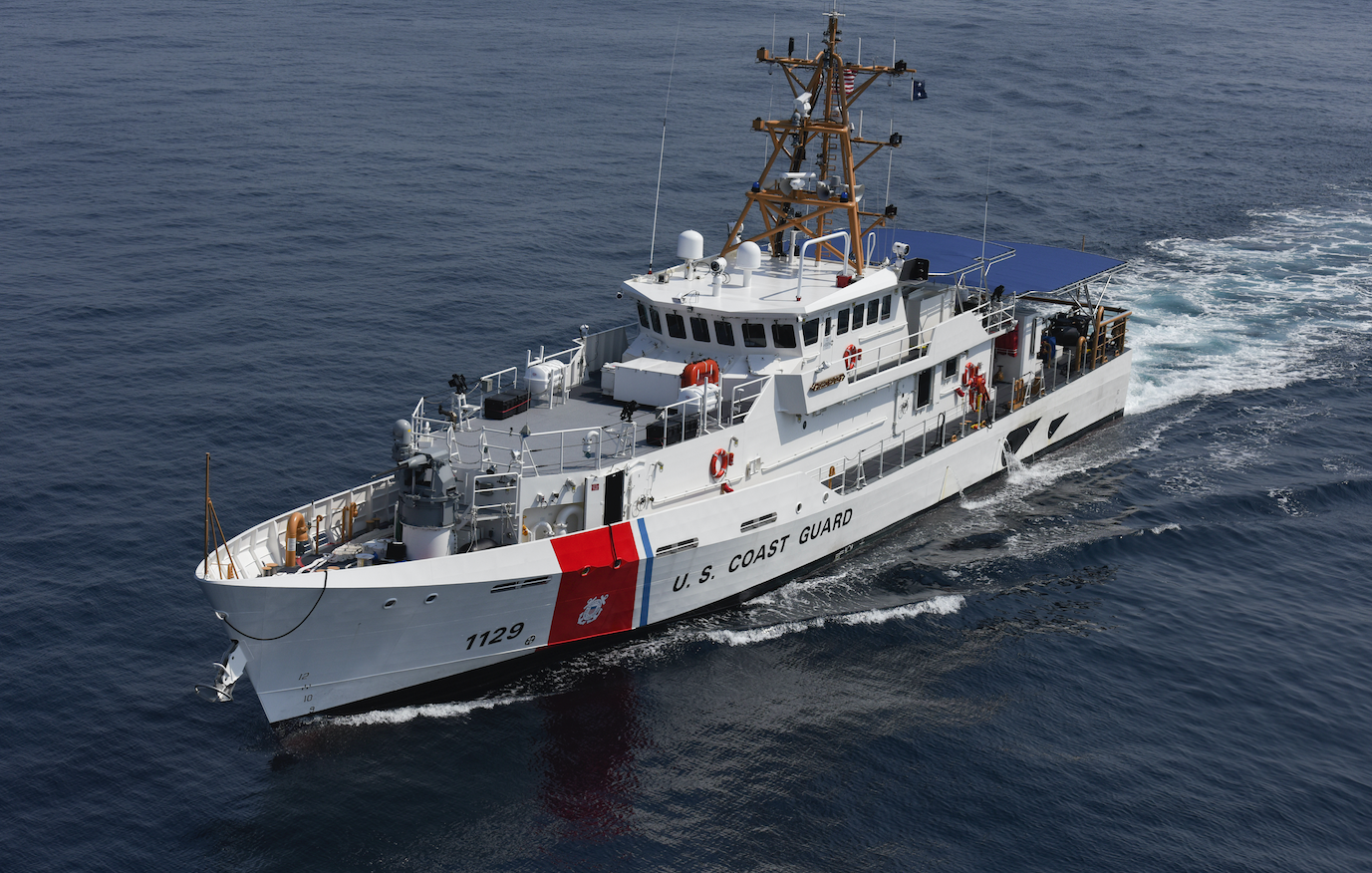
USCGC Forrest Rednour (WPC-1129), a U.S. Coast Guard Sentinel-class cutter

The United States military has numerous types of watercraft, operated by the Navy, including Naval Special Warfare Command and Military Sealift Command, as well as the Coast Guard, Army and Air Force

== Commissioned ships (USN) ==
=== Aircraft carriers ===
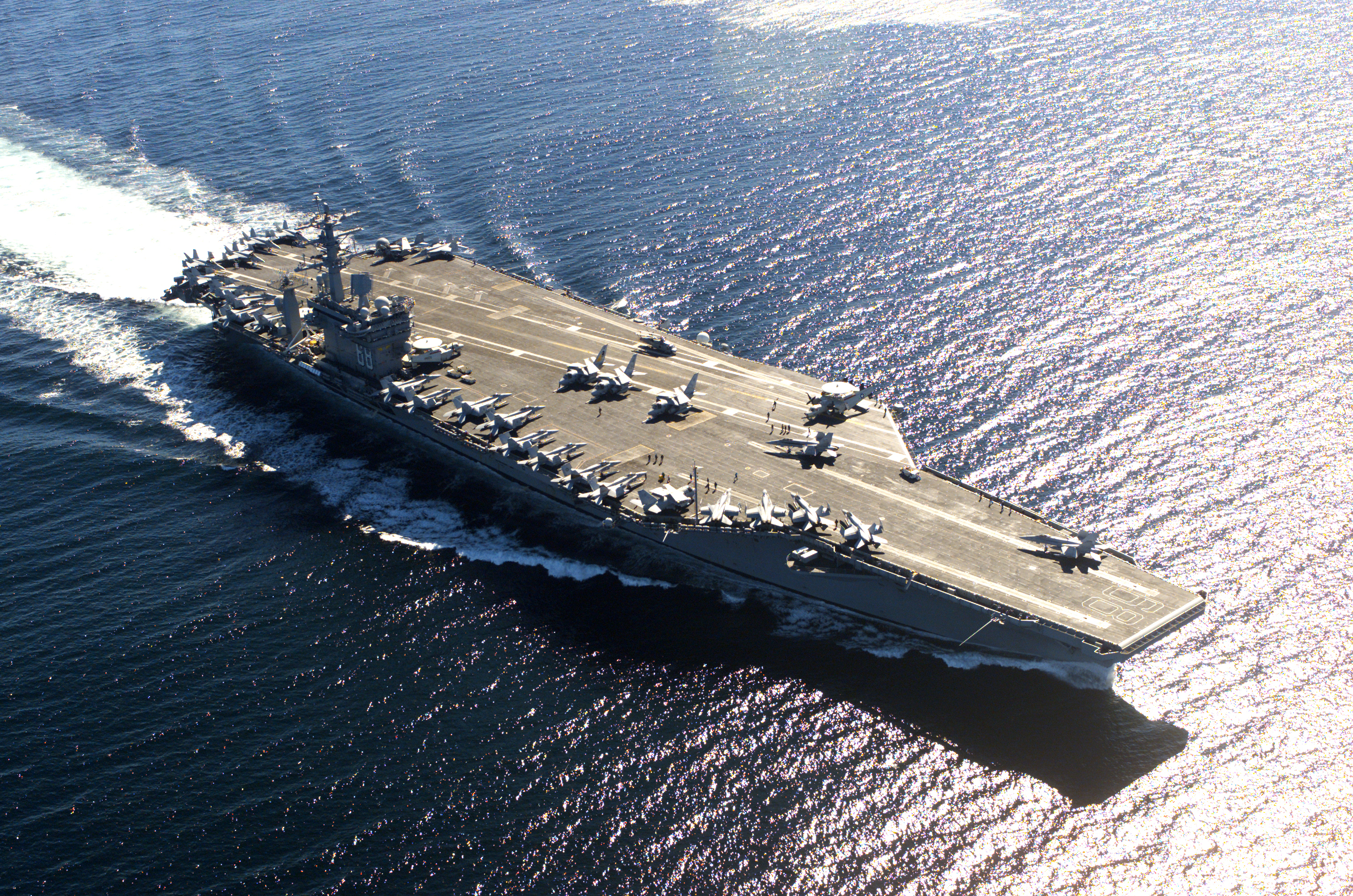
USS Nimitz, the lead ship of her class of nuclear-powered aircraft carriers, known as 'supercarriers'.

- Nimitz class – 10 active
- Gerald R. Ford class – 1 active

=== Amphibious assault ships ===
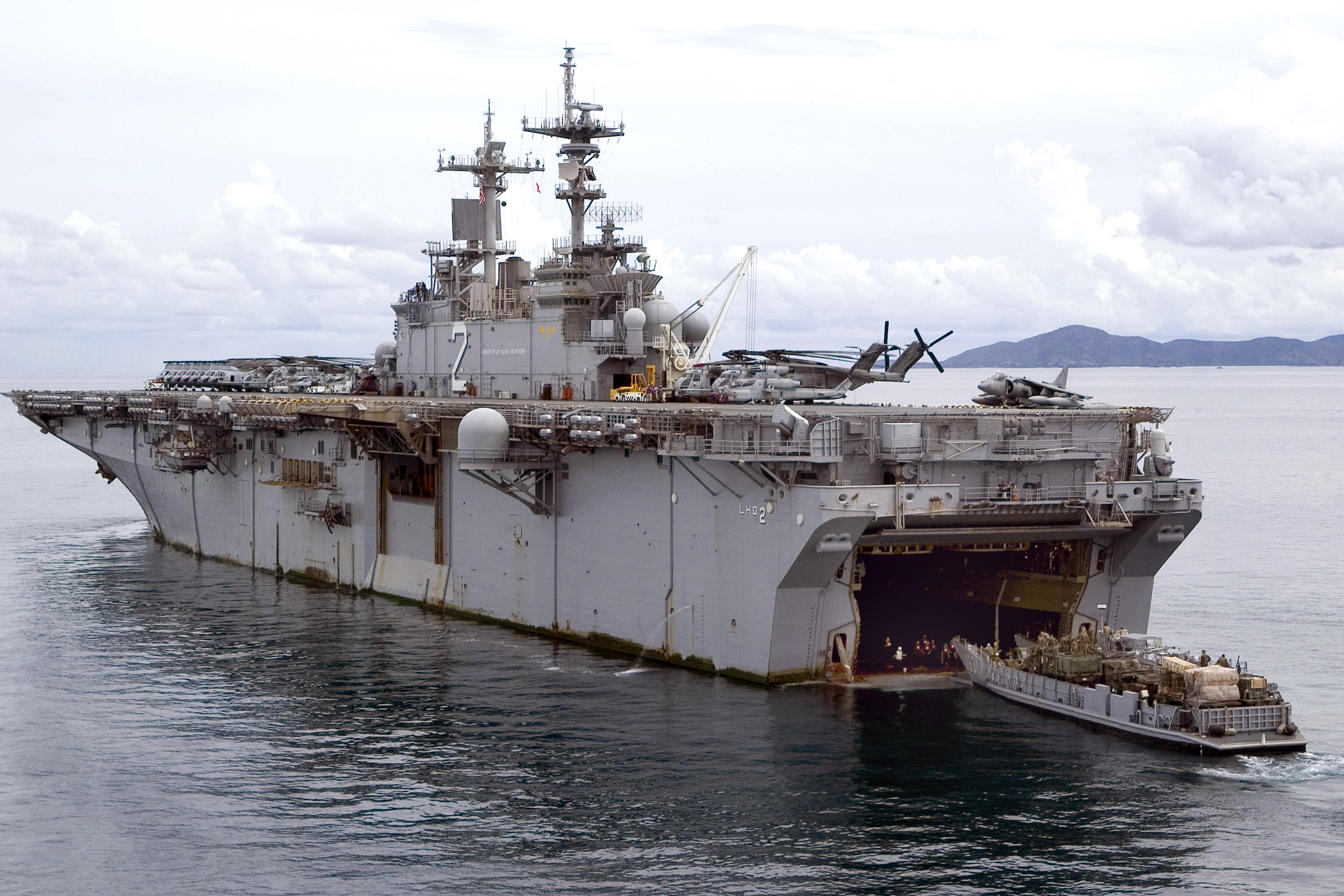
Wasp class amphibious assault ship takes aboard a Landing Craft Utility

- Wasp class – 7 active
- America class – 2 active

=== Amphibious command ships ===
- Blue Ridge class – 2 active

=== Amphibious transport docks ===
- San Antonio class – 12 active

=== Attack submarines ===
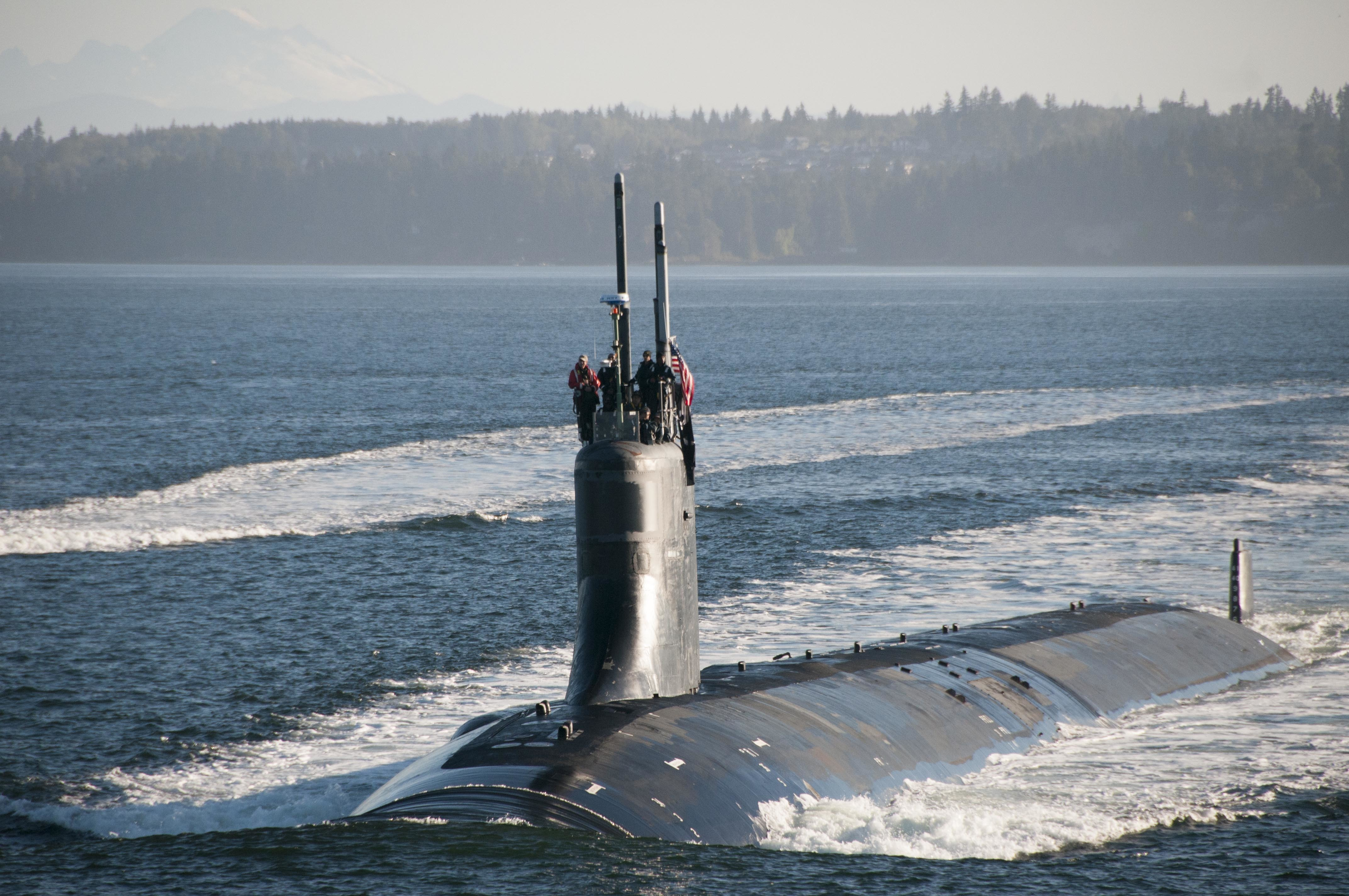
Seawolf-class submarine USS Jimmy Carter transits the Hood Canal as the boat returns home to Naval Base Kitsap-Bangor

- Los Angeles class – 23 active
- Seawolf class – 3 active
- Virginia class – 24 active

=== Ballistic missile submarines ===
- Ohio class – 14 active

=== Classic frigate ===
- USS Constitution – oldest commissioned ship in USN, an 'Original Six' frigate, circa. 1797. Not counted as part of the deployed combat fleet.

=== Cruisers ===
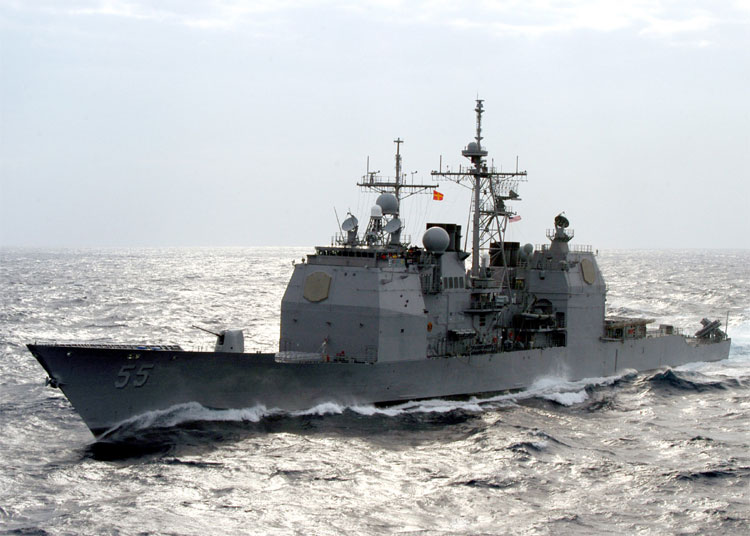
USS Leyte Gulf (Ticonderoga class)

- Ticonderoga class – 5 active

=== Destroyers ===
- Arleigh Burke class – 74 active
- Zumwalt class – 2 active

=== Dock landing ships ===
- Whidbey Island class – 6 active
- Harpers Ferry class – 4 active

=== Expeditionary mobile base ===
(sub-variant of the expeditionary transfer dock)

- Montford Point class
  - USS Lewis B. Puller (ESB-3)
  - USS Hershel "Woody" Williams

=== Guided missile submarines ===
- Ohio class – 4 active

=== Littoral combat ships ===
- Freedom class – 10 active
- Independence class – 16 active

=== Mine countermeasures ships ===
- Avenger class – 4 active

=== Submarine tenders ===
- Emory S. Land class – 2 active

=== Technical research ship ===
- USS Pueblo (AGER-2) – currently held captive by North Korea. Still in commission, but not counted as part of the deployed combat fleet.

== Non-commissioned ships (MSC) ==
(List includes "Support" and "Ready Reserve Force" ships)

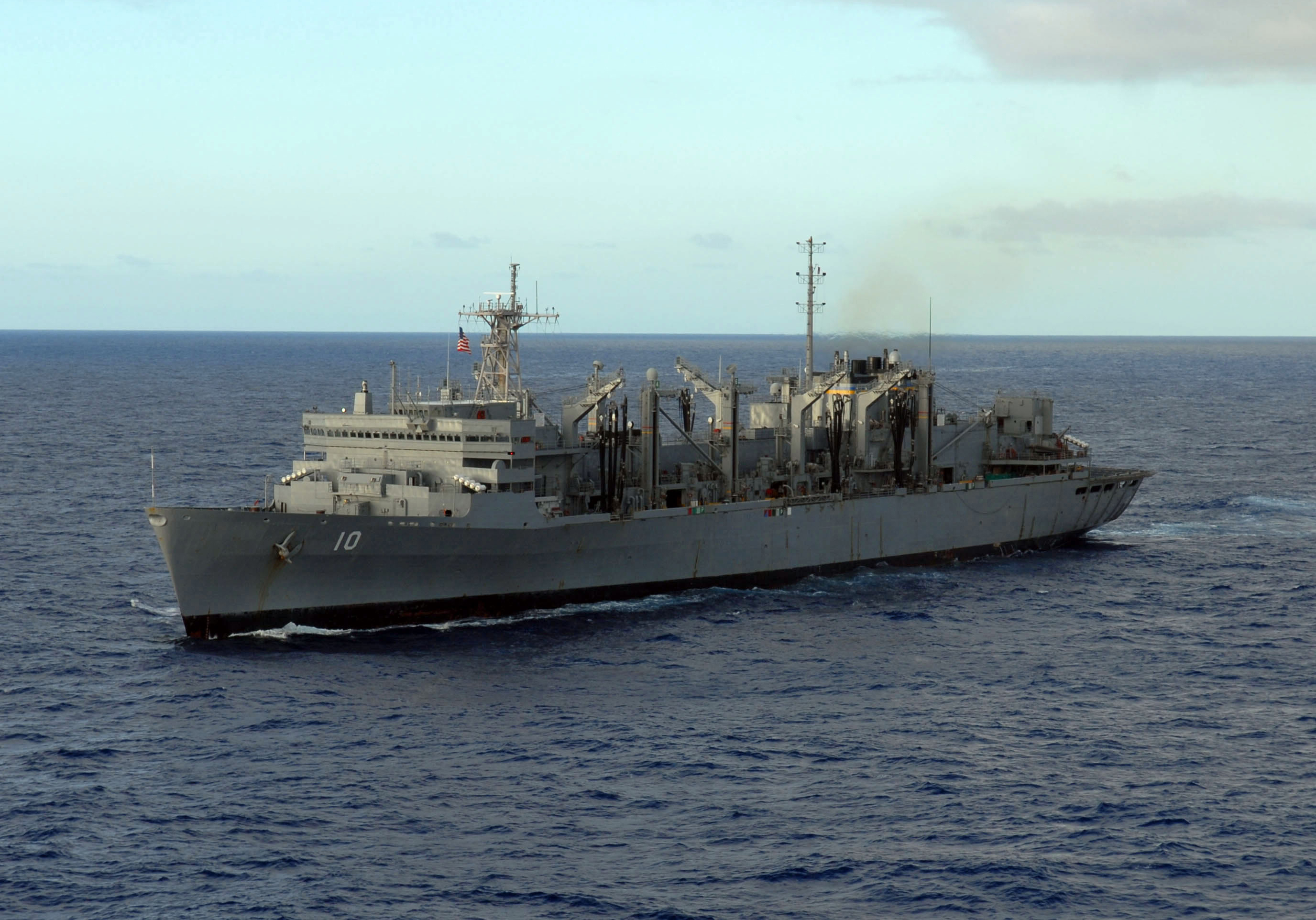
USNS Bridge (Supply class)

=== Cable repair ships ===
- Zeus class – 1 active

=== Cargo and replenishment ships ===
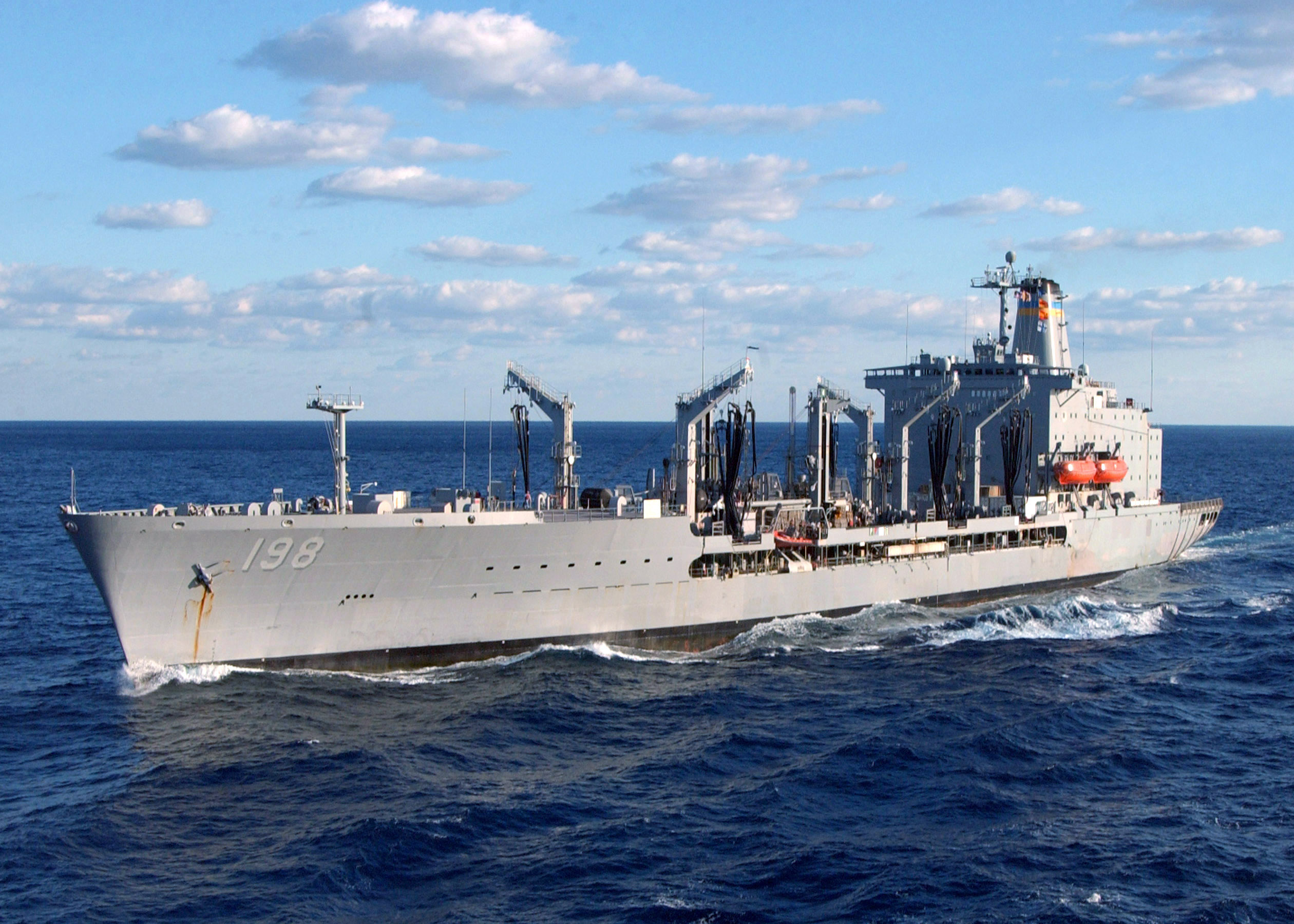
USNS Big Horn (Henry J. Kaiser-class oiler)

- Watson-class vehicle cargo ship – 8 active
- Bob Hope-class vehicle cargo ship – 7 active
- Shughart-class vehicle cargo ship – 3 active
- Gordon-class vehicle cargo ship – 2 active
- Supply-class fast combat support ship – 2 active
- Lewis and Clark-class dry cargo ship – 14 active
- Henry J. Kaiser-class replenishment oiler – 14 active

=== Crane ships ===
- Gopher State class – 3 active
- Keystone State class – 3 active

=== Expeditionary transfer dock ===
- Montford Point class
  - Expeditionary Transfer Dock (ESD) – 2 active
  - Expeditionary Mobile Base (ESB) – 5 active

=== High speed vessels ===
- Spearhead-class expeditionary fast transport – 11 active

Stand-alone vessels;

- Sea Fighter (FSF-1) – active
- USNS Guam (HST-1) – active
- HST-2 (unnamed) – leased to civilian ferry service

=== Hospital ships ===
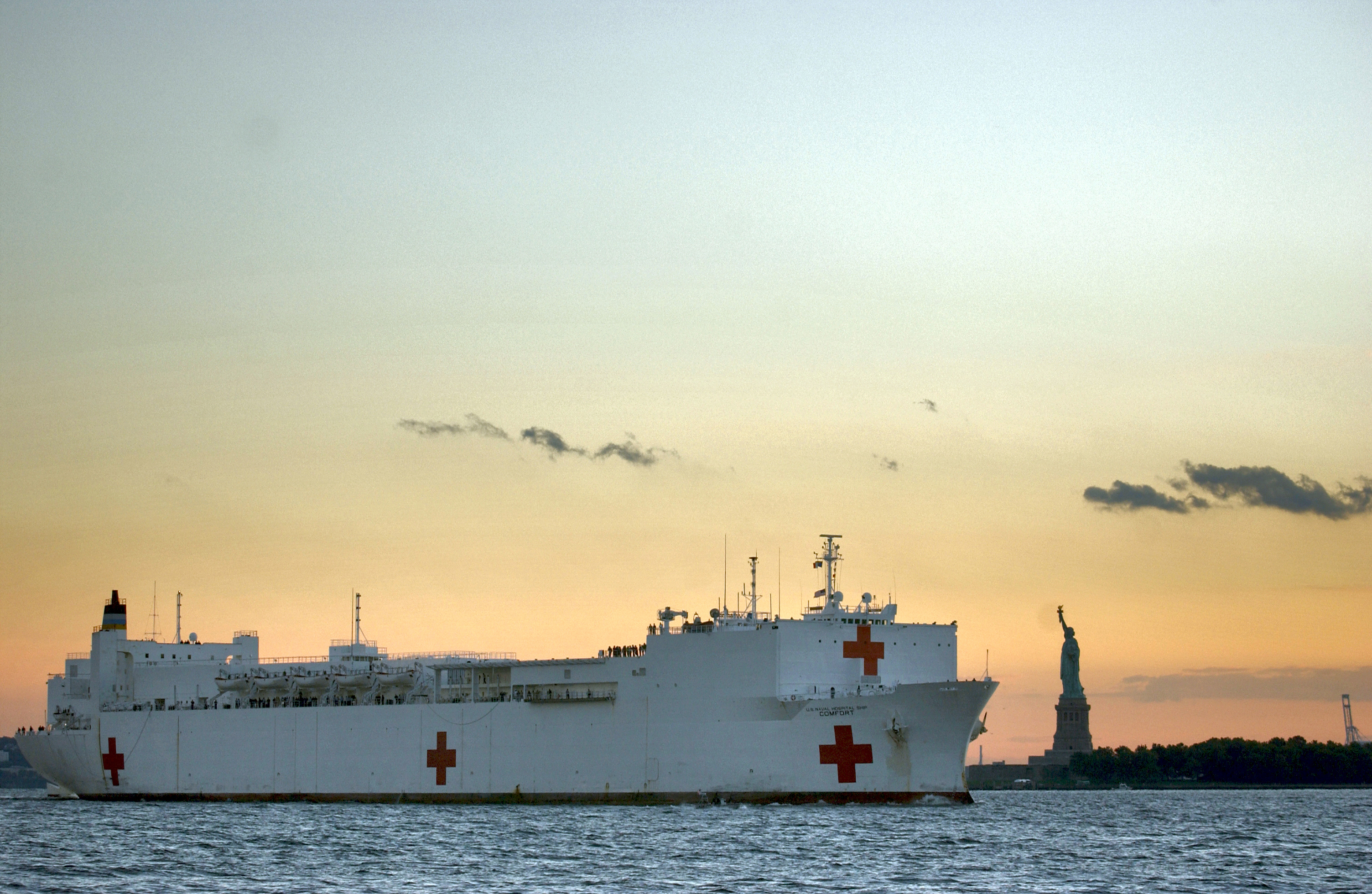
The USNS Comfort hospital ship

- Mercy class – 2 active

=== Landing craft ===
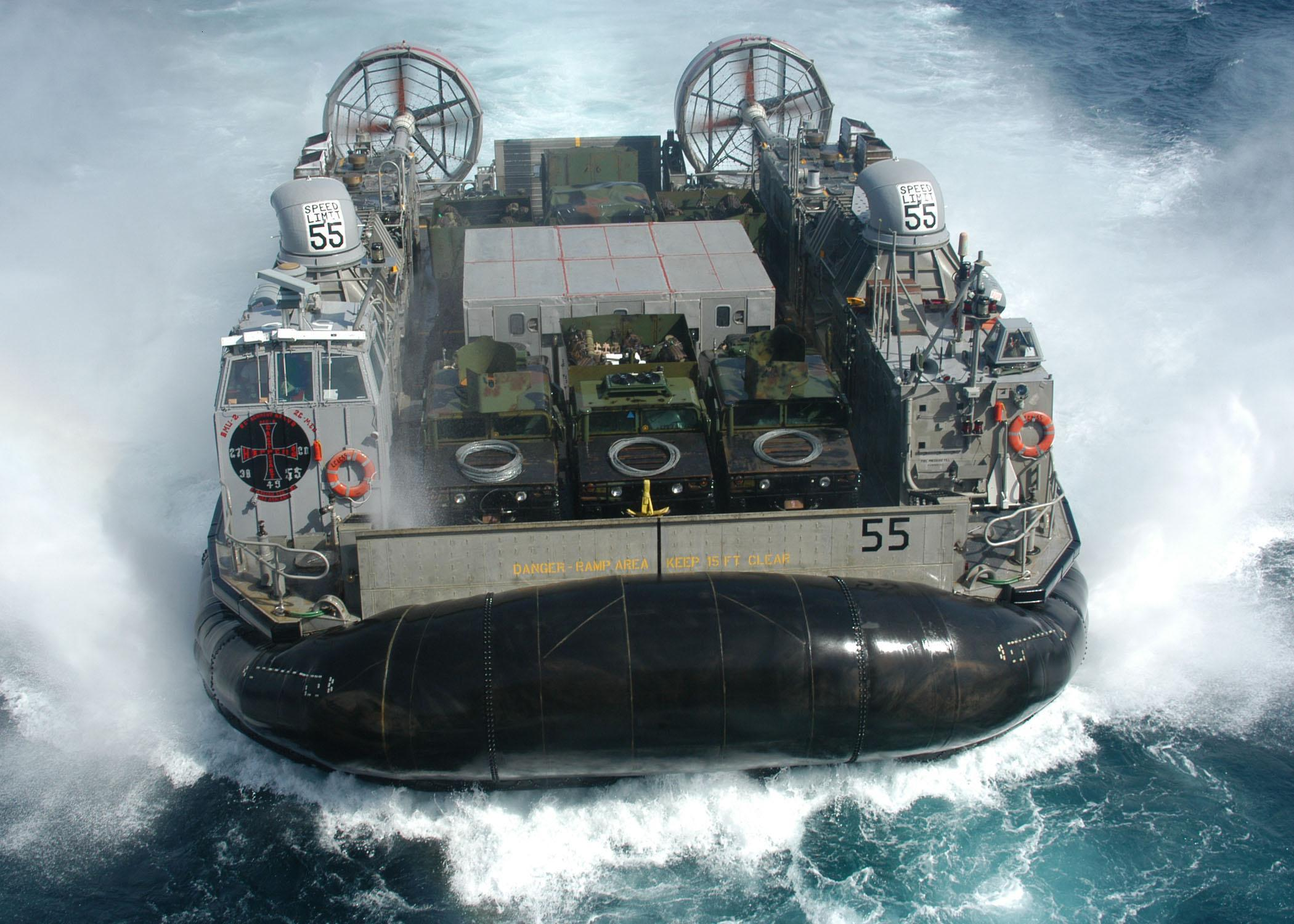
LCAC

- Landing Craft Air Cushion – 74 active
- Landing Craft Utility 1610, 1627 and 1646 – 32 active

=== Salvage ships ===
- Safeguard class – 2 active

=== Surveillance, intelligence and survey vessels ===
- Howard O. Lorenzen-class instrumentation ship – 1 active
- Impeccable-class ocean surveillance ship – 1 active
- Pathfinder-class survey ship – 6 active
- Stalwart-class ocean surveillance ship – 2 active
- Victorious-class ocean surveillance ship – 4 active

=== Tug boats ===
- Powhatan-class fleet ocean tug – 1 active
- Natick-class large harbor tug – 8 active
- Valiant-class harbor tug – 6 active

== Special Warfare and Coastal Riverine Force (NSW) ==
=== Surface craft ===
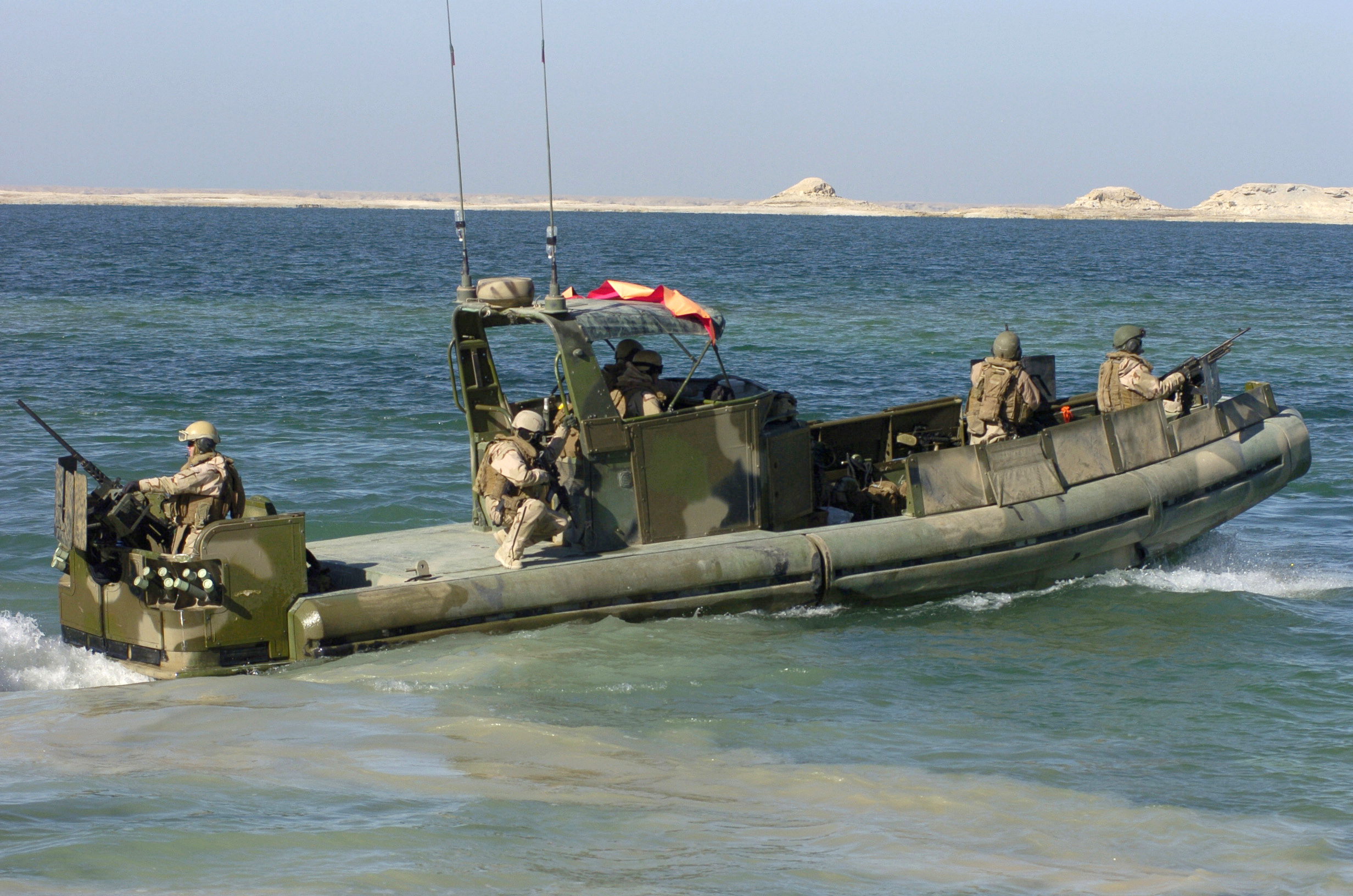
Small Unit Riverine Craft

- Combat Rubber Raiding Craft
- Small unit riverine craft
- Riverine Command Boat
- Rigid Raider
- Mark V Special Operations Craft
- Special Operations Craft - Riverine (SOC-R)
- Mark VI Patrol Boat
- Coastal Command Boat (CCB)
- Combatant Craft Assault (CCA)
- Combatant Craft Medium (CCM)
- Combatant Craft Heavy (CCH)

=== Swimmer delivery vehicles ===
- Swimmer Delivery Vehicle (Mk 8)
- Surface-Planing Wet Submersible

== Cutters (USCG) ==
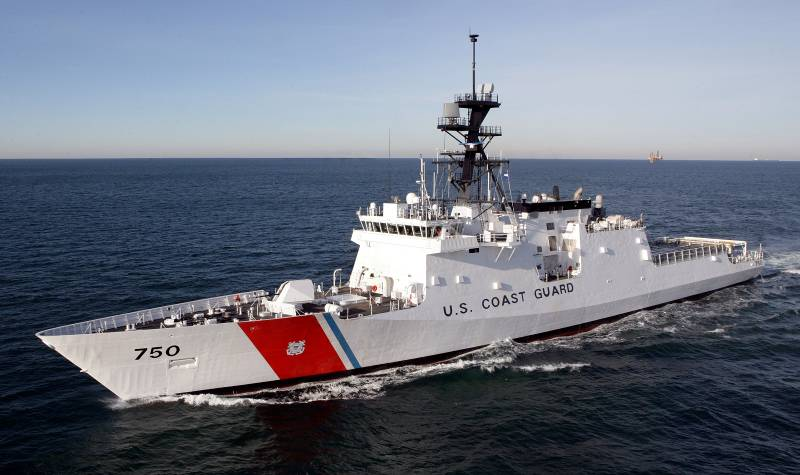
USCG Legend-class cutter

=== Patrol ships ===
- Legend-class National Security Cutter, Large 8
- USCGC Alex Haley (WMEC-39)
- Famous-class Medium Endurance Cutter 13
- Reliance-class Medium Endurance Cutter 14
- Sentinel-class cutter 38

=== Patrol boats ===
- Island-class patrol boat 30
- Marine Protector-class coastal patrol boat 73
- 47-foot Motor Lifeboat 117
- Response boat-medium 48
- USCG Utility Boat 156
- USCG Long Range Interceptor 10
- Defender class Response boat-small 300
- USCG transportable port security boat
- Over the horizon boat
- Short Range Prosecutor 10

=== Icebreakers ===
- Bay-class icebreaking tug 9 active
- Polar class 1 active

Stand-alone vessels;

- USCGC Mackinaw (WLBB-30)
- USCGC Healy (WAGB-20)

=== Tenders ===
- USCG seagoing buoy tender
- USCG coastal buoy tender
- USCG inland buoy tender
- USCG inland construction tender

== Support craft (US Army) ==
=== Logistics support vessel ===
- General Frank S. Besson-class logistics support vessel – 8

=== Landing craft ===
- Runnymede class large landing craft – 35
- Landing Craft Mechanized
  - LCM-8, Mod 1 - 34
  - LCM-8, Mod 2 - 6

=== Tug boats ===
- MGen. Nathanael Greene-class tugboat – 6

== Support craft (USAF) ==
=== Tug boats ===
- Rising Star tugboat (Thule AFB harbor)

=== Recovery craft ===
- 82nd ATRS drone recovery watercraft (x3 120 ft recovery vessels, x2 smaller boats)

== See also ==
- Currently active military equipment by country
