= Special Operations Craft – Riverine =

US Navy boat

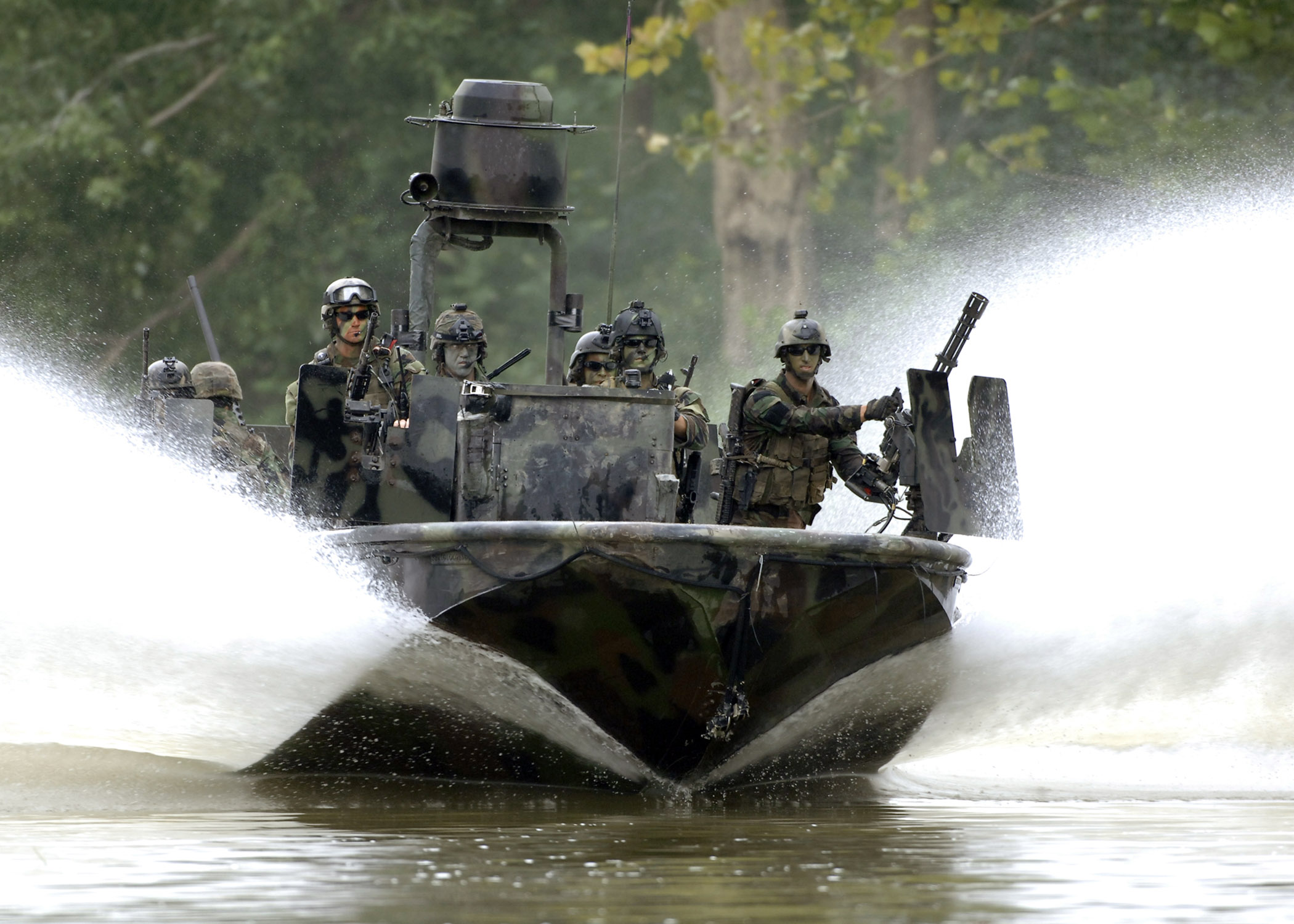
- SOC-R transiting the Salt River in northern Kentucky during pre-deployment training

Class overview
- Name: SOC-R (Special Operations Craft Riverine)
- Builders: United States Marine Inc.
- Operators: United States Navy, Ukrainian Navy, Ukrainian Air Assault Forces, Special Operations Forces (Ukraine), Hungarian Defence Forces

General characteristics
- Type: River boat
- Displacement: 16,200 pounds (7,300 kg) (empty); 20,800 pounds (9,400 kg) (max loadout)
- Length: 33 ft (10 m)
- Beam: 2.97m
- Draft: 2 ft (0.61 m)
- Propulsion: 2 × 440 hp Yanmar 6LY2M-STE diesel engines each driving a Hamilton HJ292 water pump-jet
- Speed: 40 knots (74 km/h; 46 mph)
- Range: 125 nautical miles (232 km; 144 mi)
- Capacity: 700 lbs cargo
- Troops: 8 SEALs
- Crew: 4 crew (1 helmsman, 3 gunners)
- Sensors & processing systems: Forward Looking Infra Red (FLIR); GPS navigation; IFF (identification Friend or Foe) gear; VHF/HF/UHF/FM Net & SATCOMM
- Armament: 2 × GAU-17 miniguns (forward); 1 × M2HB .50 caliber (12.7 mm) machine gun (aft); 2 × M240B 7.62 mm light machine gun(s) (side-mounted); 2 × 40 mm Mk 19 grenade launcher
- Armor: Ballistic protection (up to .7.62mm x 39mm ball) for the engines, helmsman and gunners

Special Operations Craft – Riverine is a boat used by the United States Navy to perform short-range insertion and extraction of special operations forces in river and near-shore environments. It replaced the Patrol Boat, River, and the mini armored troop carrier.

== Design ==
Designed for speed and tight turns, the SOC-R's V-shape belly allows the boat to skate along the surface, with relatively little drag on the hull. There is no hanging rudder or propeller blades to snag on submerged roots and rocks.

The SOC-R's five weapon mounts provide a 360-degree field of fire. The aft-mounted .50 cal covers the boat crew as they leave the shore after an extraction.

The SOC-R and its tractor and trailer fits aboard C-130 or larger aircraft.

The craft can also be slung under an Army MH-47 helicopter using the MEATS system, which allows Combatant-Craft Crewmen to fast-rope from the helicopter onto the craft during insertion and climb a ladder from the boat to the helicopter during extraction.

=== Crew ===
Each SOC-R is crewed by four Special Warfare Combatant-craft Crewmen (SWCC) and can carry four more people. The craft are operated only by members of Special Boat Team 22 (SBT-22), based in Stennis, Mississippi. These river crews conduct mainly clandestine combat missions, often operating at night with little or no air support.

== Image gallery ==
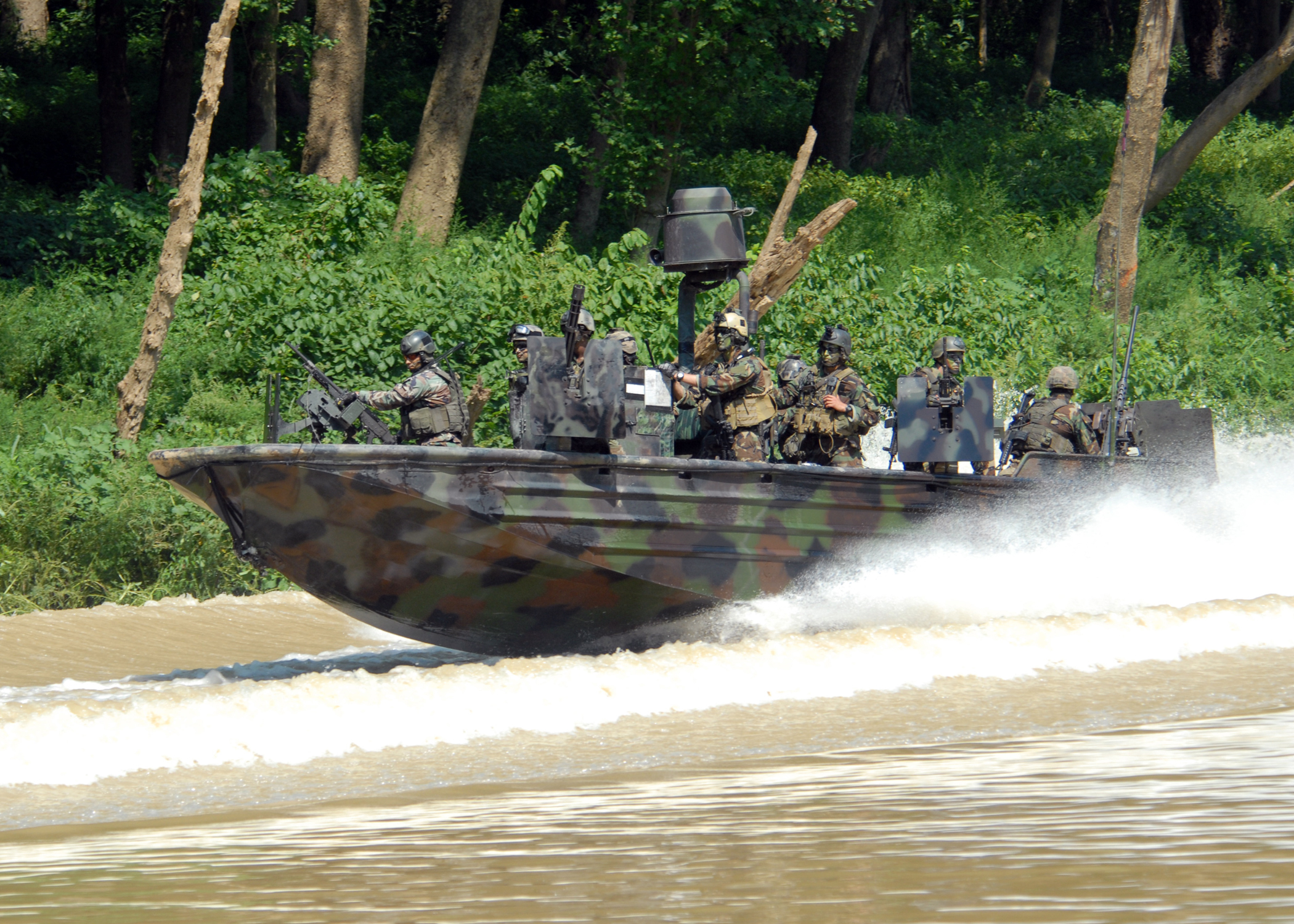

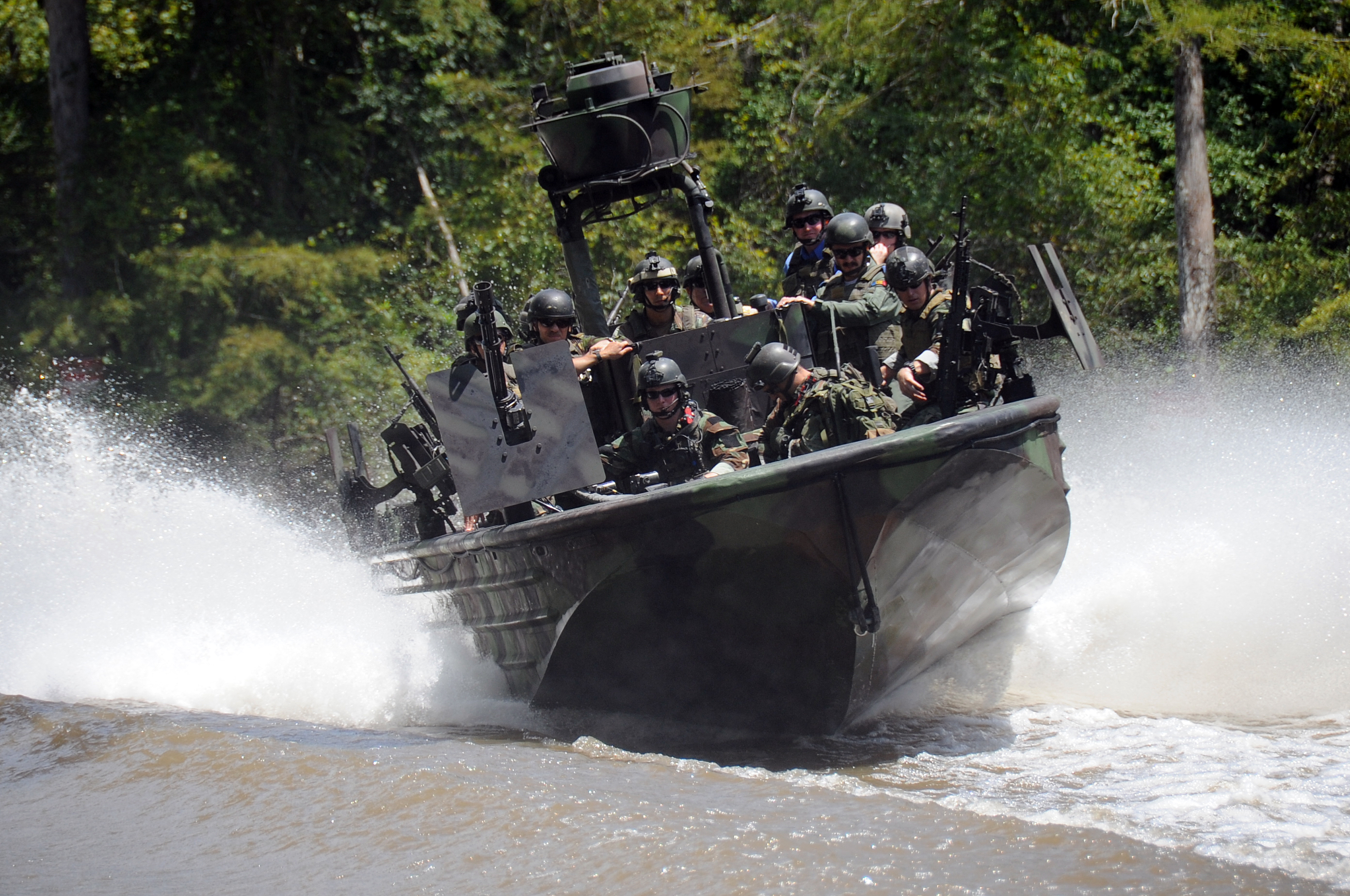

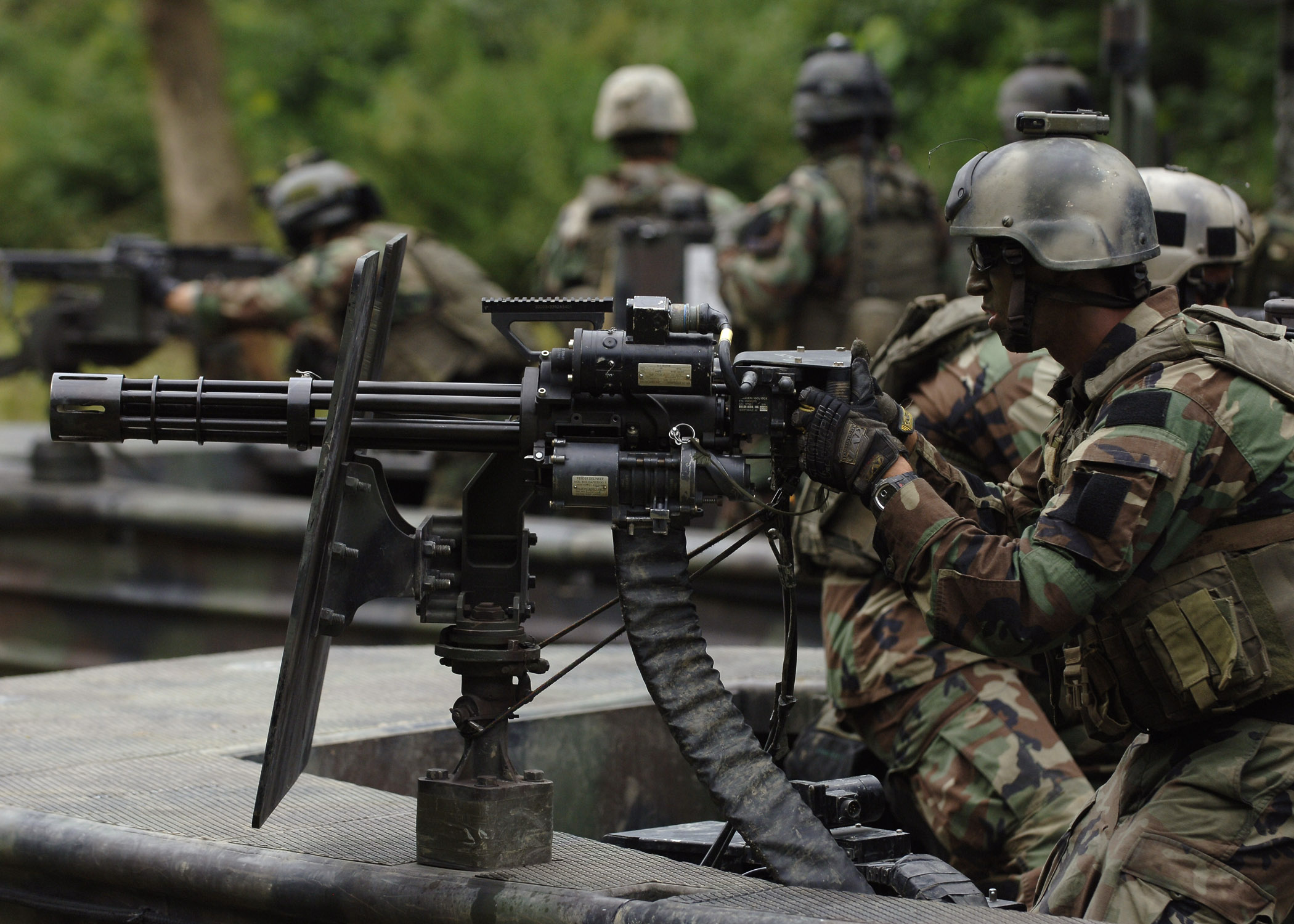

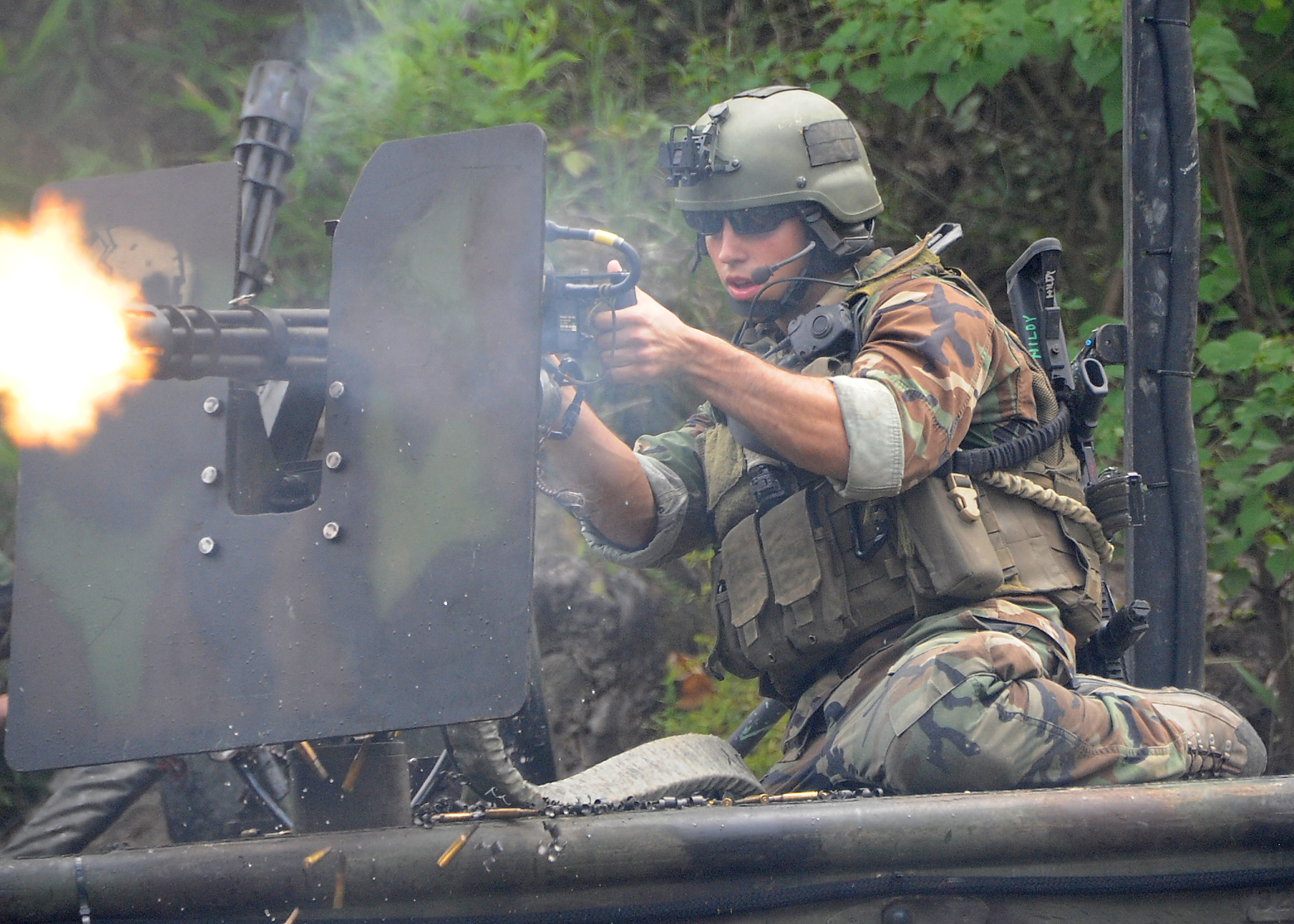

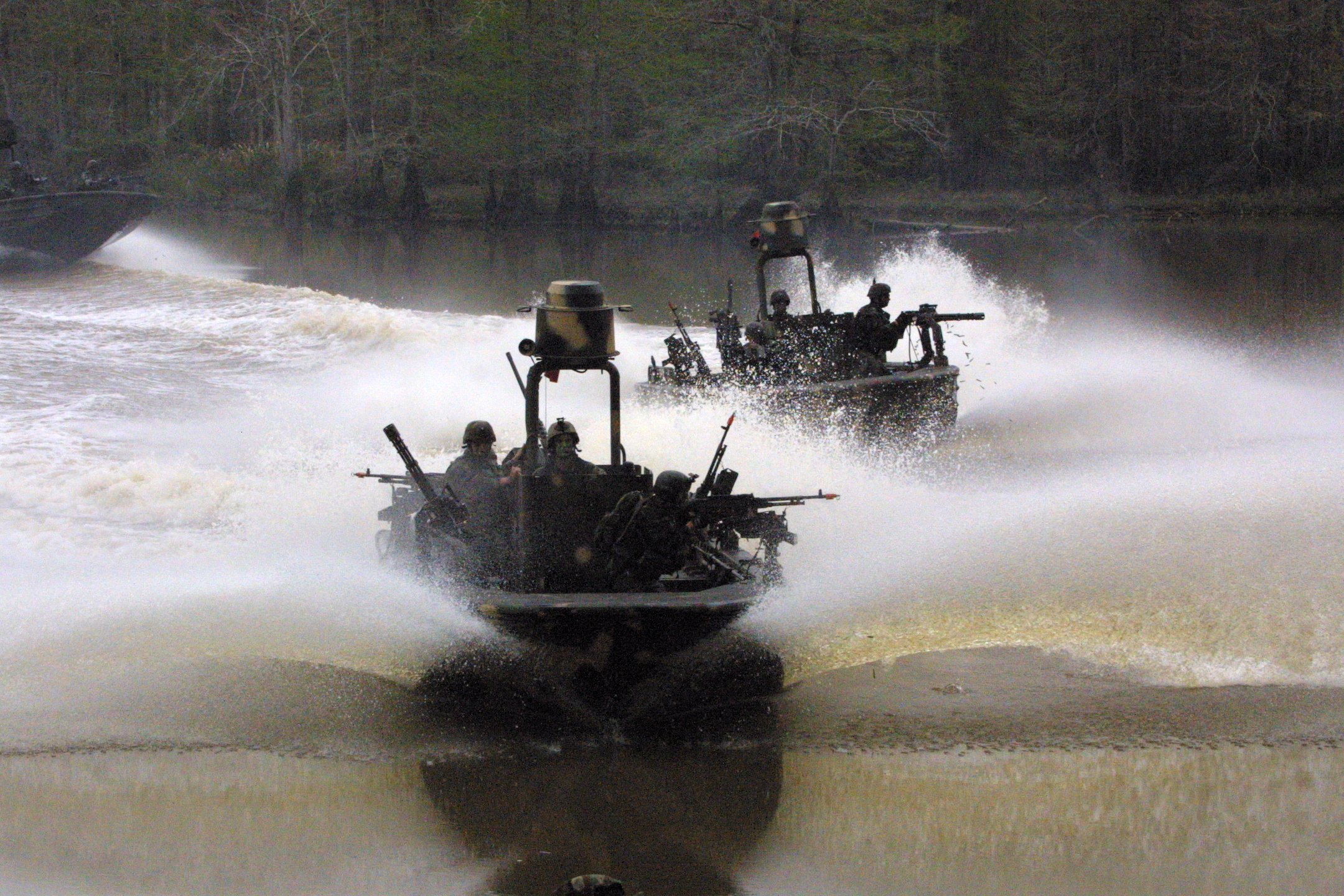

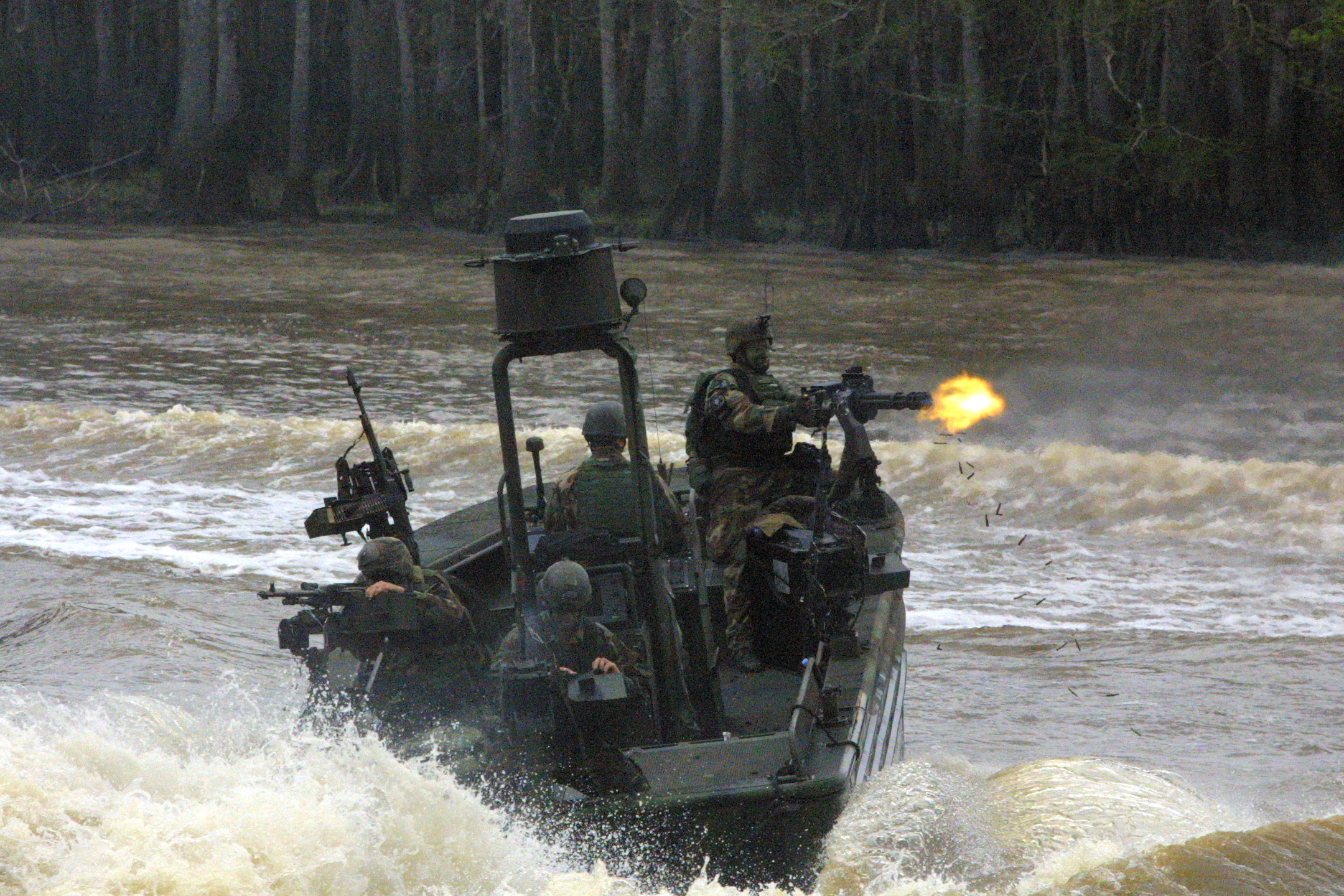

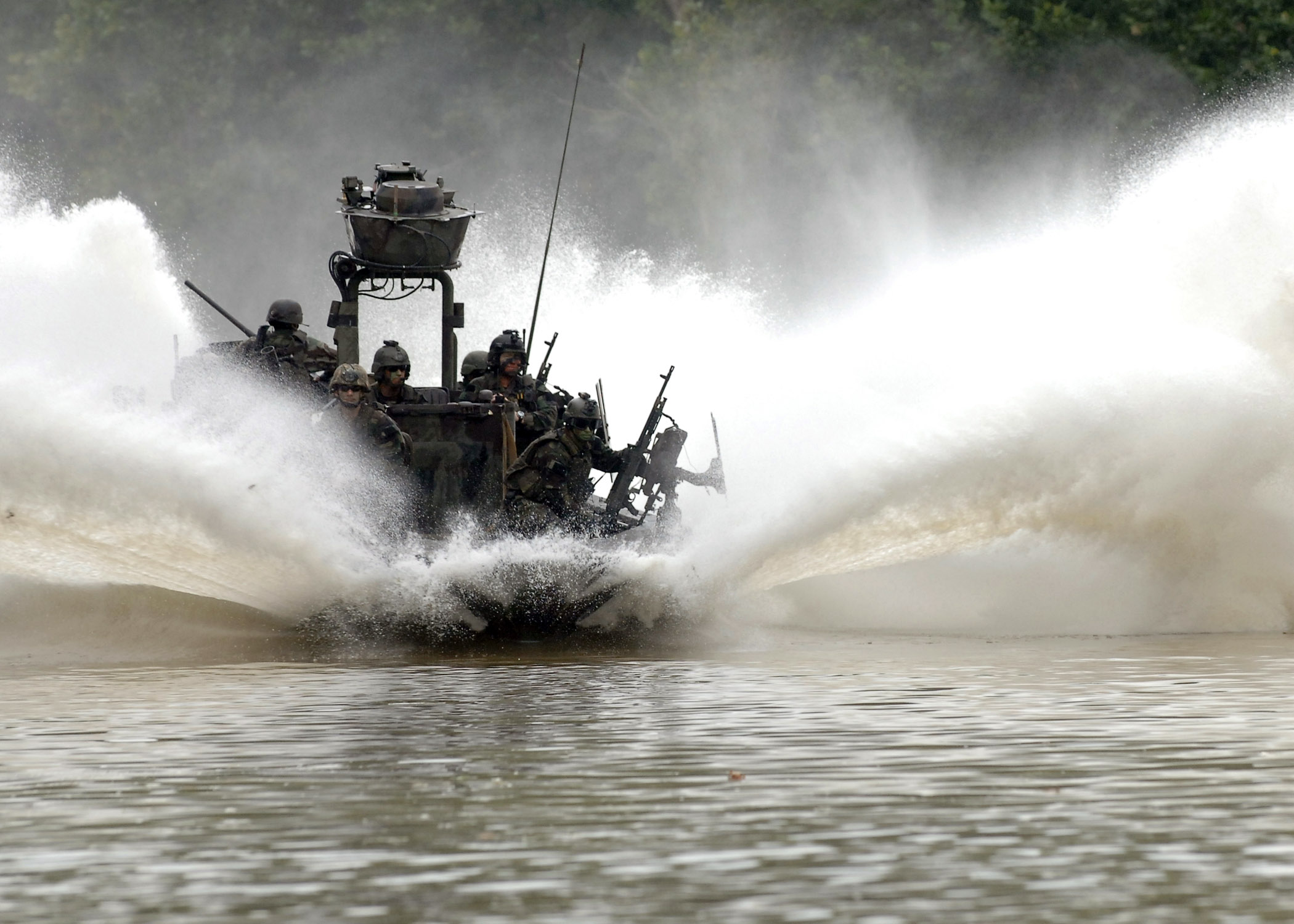

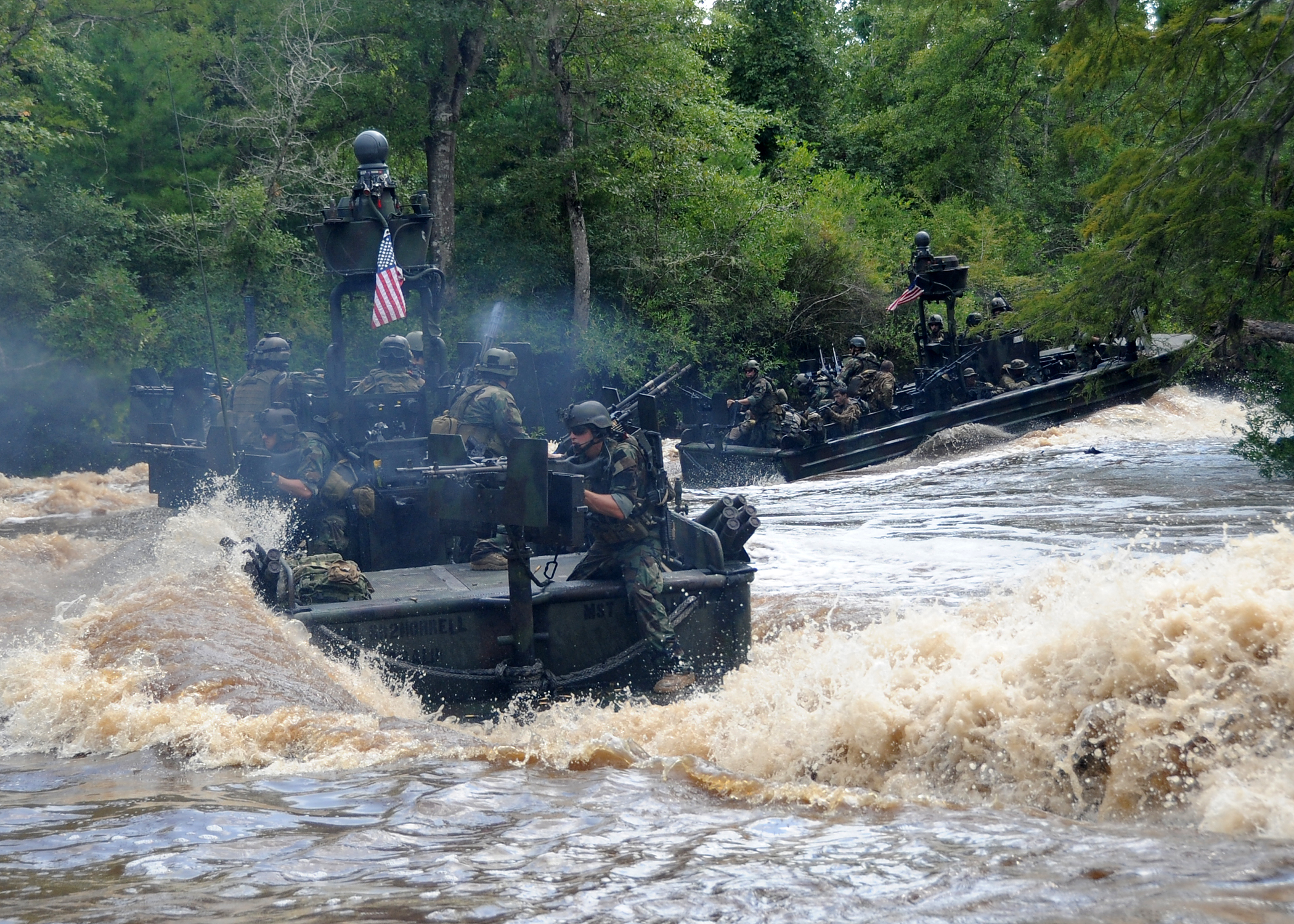

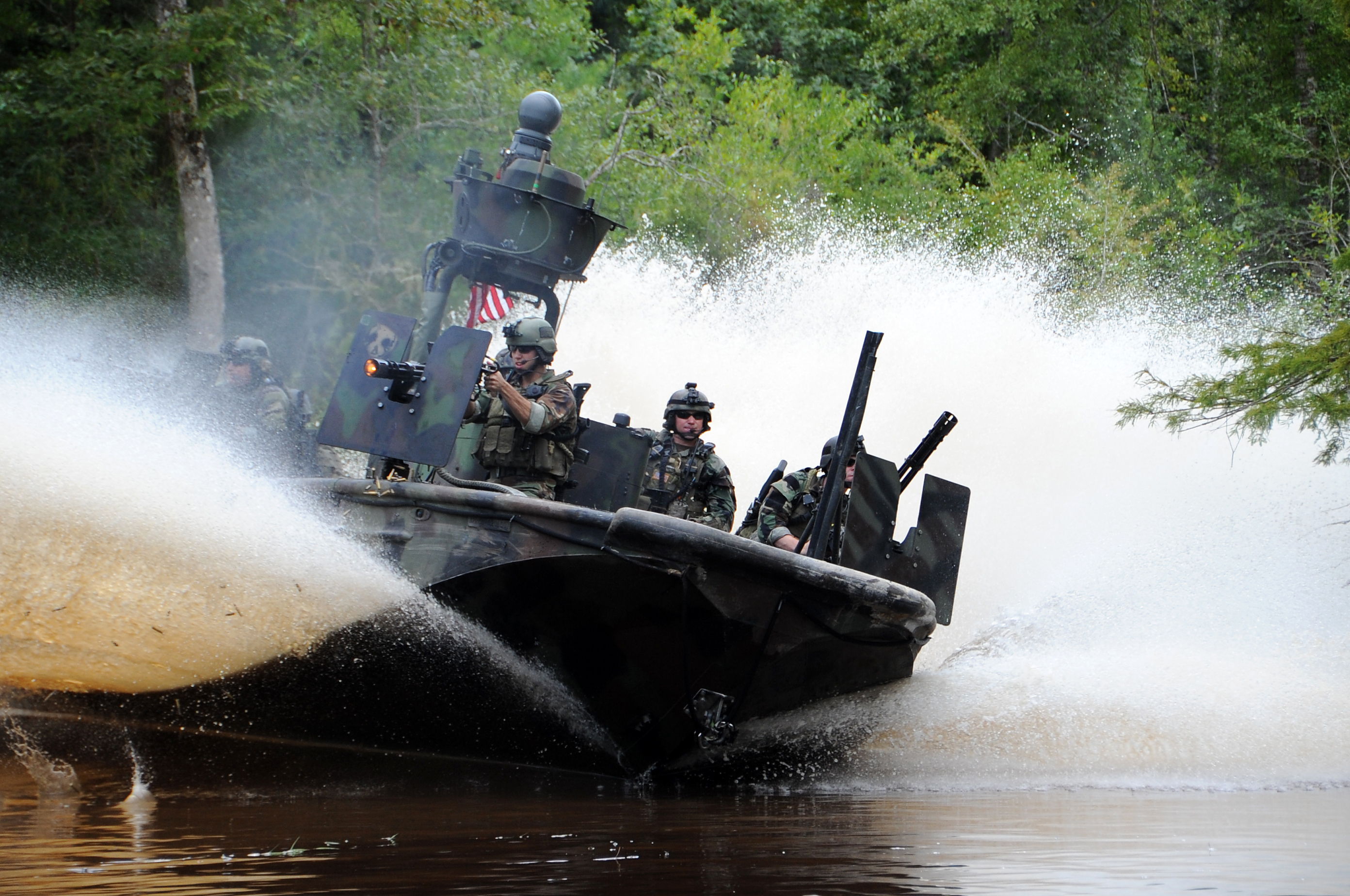

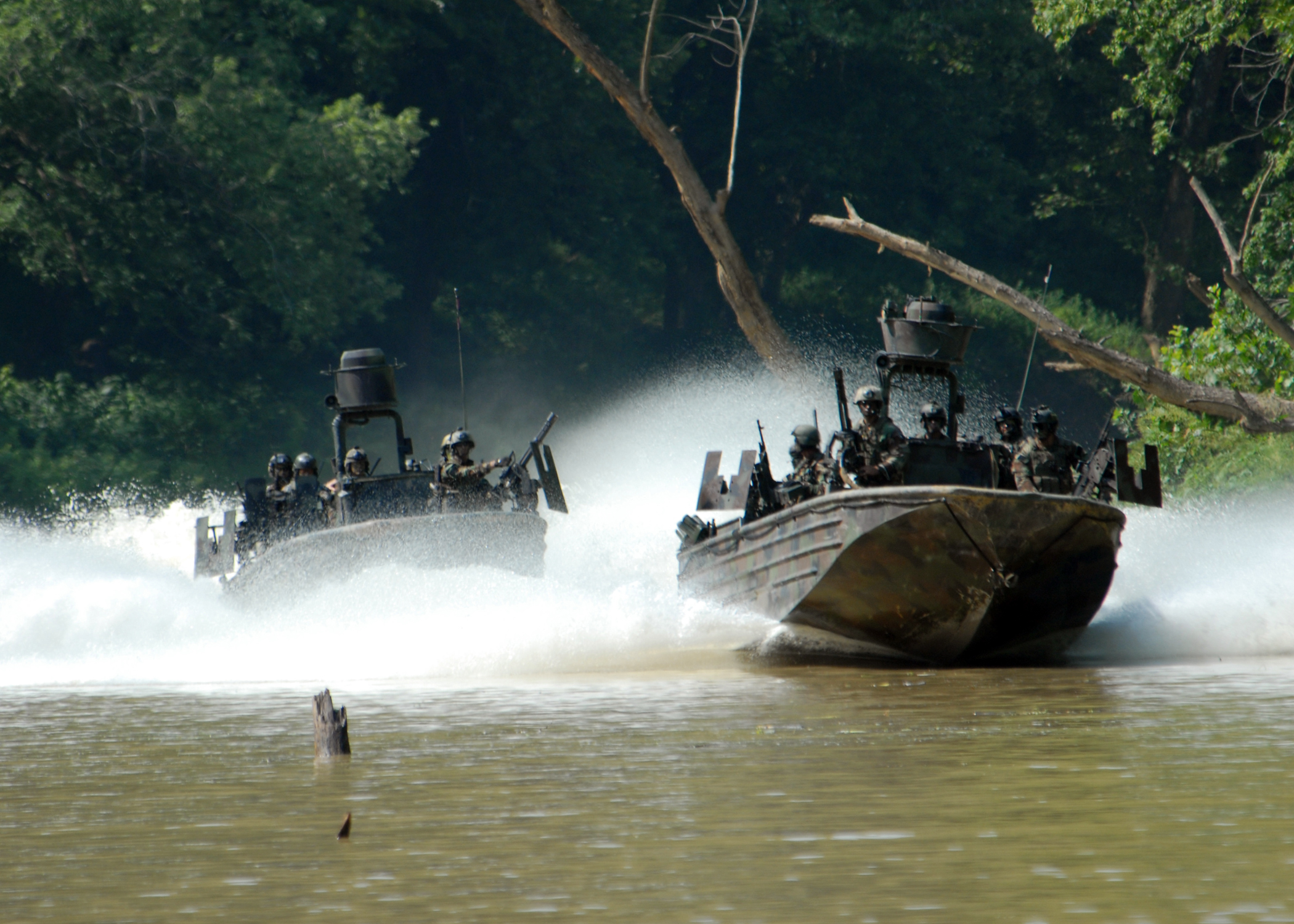

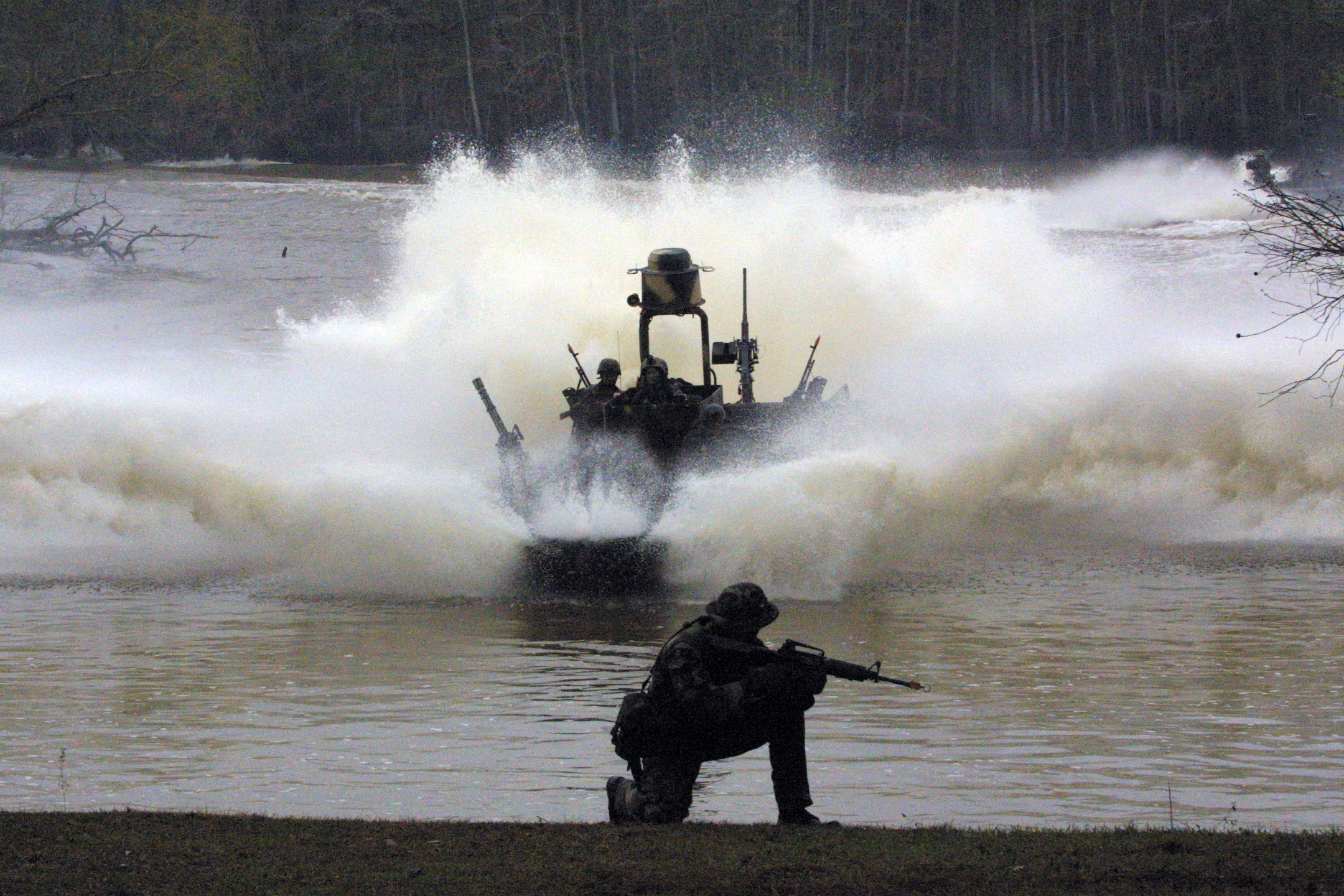

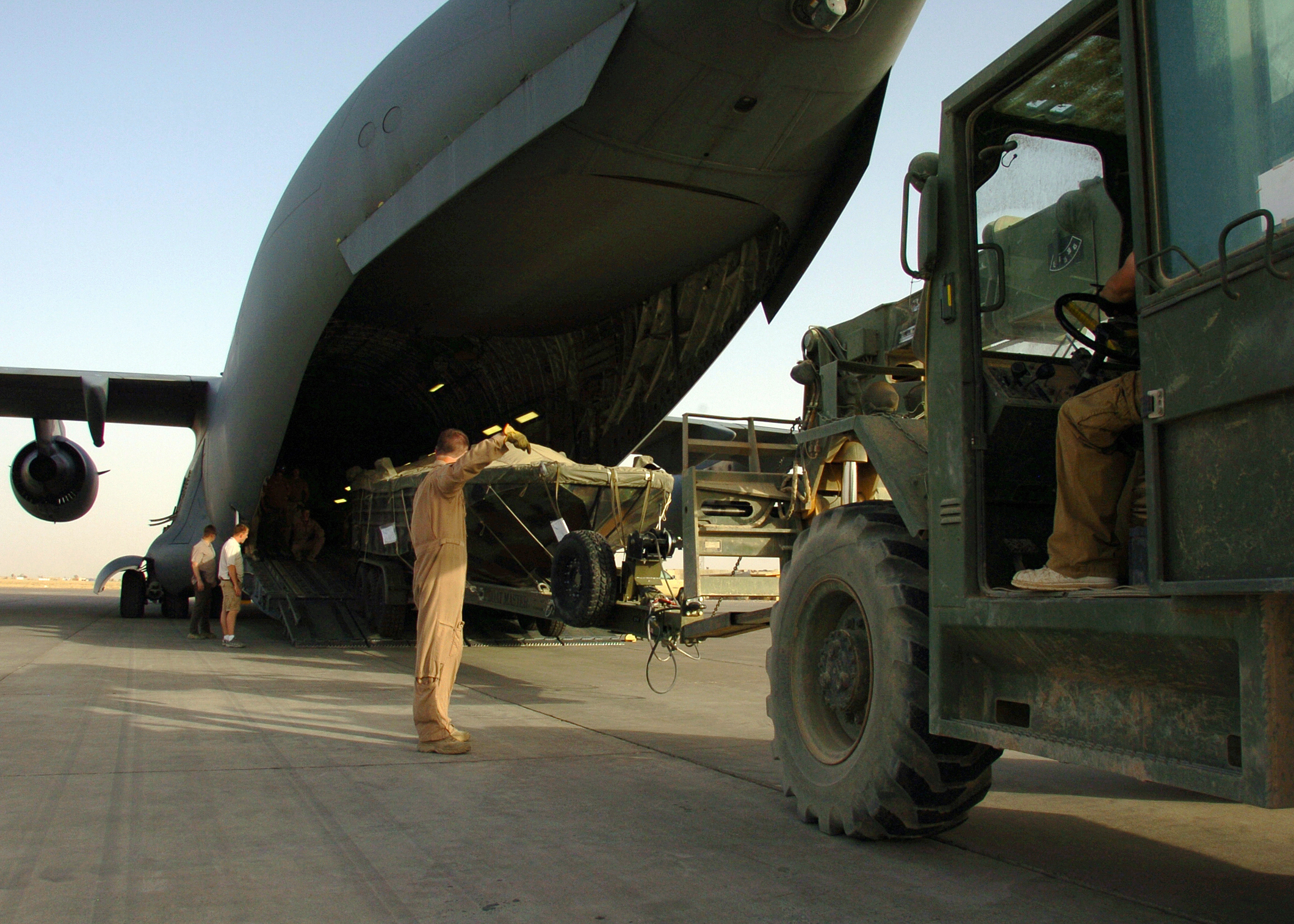

== See also ==
- Cyclone-class patrol ship
- Small unit riverine craft
- Mark V Special Operations Craft
- Combatant Craft Medium
- Mark VI patrol boat
