= Mark VI patrol boat =

United States Navy ship class

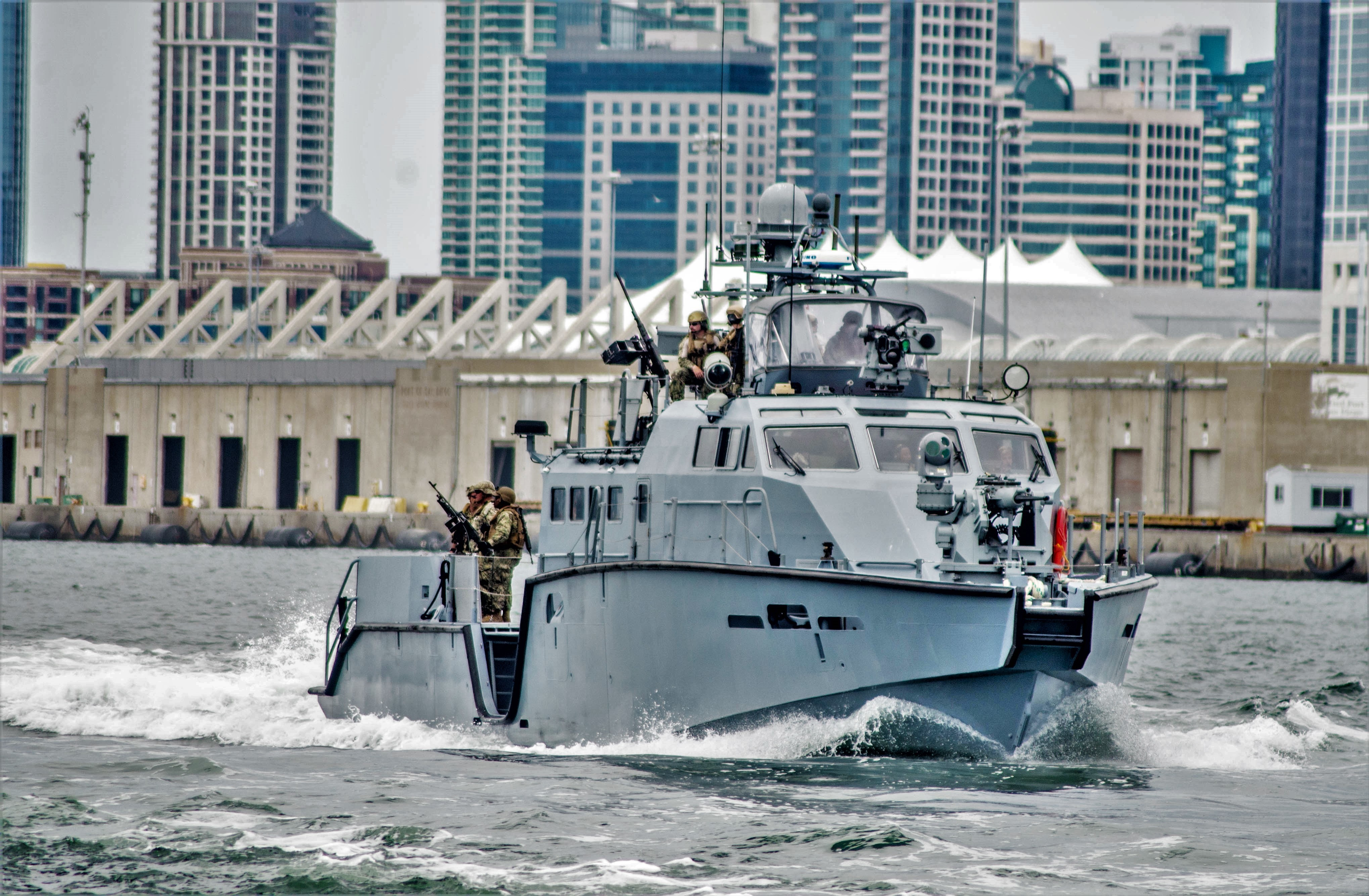
- A Mark VI patrol boat off the coast of San Diego in 2019

Class overview
- Builders: SAFE Boats International
- Operators: United States Navy; Ukrainian Navy
- Preceded by: Riverine Command Boat
- Cost: US$15 million per ship
- Built: 2015–2017
- In commission: 2016–present
- Planned: 12
- On order: 12
- Completed: 12

General characteristics
- Type: Patrol boat
- Displacement: 144,000 lb (65,000 kg) (72 tons)
- Length: 84.8 ft (25.8 m)
- Beam: 20.5 ft (6.2 m)
- Draft: 4 ft (1.2 m)
- Propulsion: MTU 16V2000M94 (x2), 5,200 HP
- Speed: 45 knots (52 mph; 83 km/h)
- Range: 750 nmi (860 mi; 1,390 km) at 25 knots; 690 nmi (790 mi; 1,280 km) at 30 knots
- Troops: 8
- Complement: 10 crew
- Armament: 2 × Mk 38 Mod 2 25 mm chain guns M2HB .50 caliber (12.7 mm) machine gun(s) M240B 7.62 mm machine gun(s)

The Mark VI is a class of patrol boat for the United States Navy, designed to patrol riverine and littoral waters. The first two Mark VI boats were delivered to Coastal Riverine Group Two in September 2015. Two boats were forward deployed to Bahrain in April 2016, with Coastal Riverine Squadron Two being the first to operate the craft in the Persian Gulf while assigned under Task Force 56. The Mark VI replaced the less capable Riverine Command Boats previously assigned to Task Force 56.

Two craft were delivered to Coastal Riverine Group One in 2016 and were subsequently forward deployed to Guam in 2017. A third craft was deployed to Bahrain in 2018 to replace the Coastal Command Boat prototype craft, which was returned to the United States where it was deactivated and placed in long-term storage. A third craft was deployed to Guam, rounding out the initial deployment of the craft. The forward deployed craft are manned by rotational crews from the Navy's Coastal Riverine Force.

The final craft were delivered to Coastal Riverine Group One in 2017, and Coastal Riverine Group Two in 2018 to complete delivery of the 12 craft. There are currently no plans to field additional craft with the Navy though several partner nations have expressed interest in potentially purchasing a number of the craft via the foreign military sales process for their own use.

== History ==
The Mark VI patrol boat is built by SAFE Boats International. It represents a shift in Navy focus from Cold War-era blue water engagements to placing importance on brown water littoral warfare operations. Designed to replace the legacy Riverine Command Boat for open water and near shore operations, the Mark VI is larger, more survivable, and better equipped with modernized weapons, communications, and intelligence, surveillance and reconnaissance systems. Despite the name the craft is not a replacement for the Mark V Special Operations Craft which was operated by Special Warfare Combatant Crewmen from 1998 to 2012 in a Special Operations role.

The craft can perform missions including patrolling shallow areas, search-and-seizure operations, escort high-value shipping and fleet units in foreign ports, and support special operations forces. Safe Boats delivered the first of 12 Mark VI craft to the Navy in August 2014. Potential customers from the Middle East and Central and South America have also made inquiries about the vessel.

Coastal Riverine Group 2 took ownership of the first two of Mark VI patrol boats on 8 September 2015. Two were first deployed to the Persian Gulf to support U.S. 5th Fleet operations out of Bahrain in April 2016, with three total on station in the 5th Fleet as of 2018.

The United States planned to acquire 48 Mark VI boats. Only 12 were ordered in 2015 and delivered by 2017. This was due to the crafts not being extensively used, suffering from reliability problems, and considered too expensive to maintain. They held off on ordering any more until 2023.

As part of American efforts to help rebuild Ukraine's naval capabilities after the Russian annexation of the Crimean Peninsula in 2014, the U.S. State Department approved a Foreign Military Sales case for the supply of up to 16 MK VI patrol boats and associated equipment to Ukraine in June 2020. 12 boats out of the 16 approved for sale were ordered in January 2022. The Ukrainian president Volodymyr Zelenskyy said that deliveries of the Mark VI patrol boats to Ukraine will begin in 2022 in 2020. The Port of Tacoma announced that SAFE Boats had taken delivery of the first hull for fitting out at their premises there in early January 2023 but did not provide an exact date. The vessels bound for Ukrainian service were to be more heavily armed than their American counterparts, replacing the 25 mm MK 38 Mod 2 chain guns with the 30 mm Mk44 Bushmaster II.

In 2026, the Michigan National Guard began using an ex-Navy Mark VI patrol boat acquired through the Defense Logistics Agency to simulate fast-attack boats and perform support tasks to allow visiting pilots to train in air operations in maritime surface warfare and related missions at its training facilities on Lake Huron.

== Design ==
The Mark VI is 84.8 ft (25.8 m) long, significantly longer than previous classes of Navy patrol boats. It has a crew of 10 sailors and can carry 8 additional personnel. The interior is spacious, with berthing for the crew and shock-absorbing seats for other occupants; the seats and sound deadening berthing spaces and galley allow the crew to operate in relatively high sea states while attenuating crew fatigue and risk of injury. The boats are fully networked with a command, control, communication and computing, surveillance and intelligence (C4SI) suite for enhanced situational awareness, survivability, and multi-mission support which includes flat screen monitors mounted throughout the ship. Payloads can be configured to fulfill missions ranging from mine hunting to defending against swarm boat attacks.

Standard armament consists of two remote-controlled Mk 38 Mod 2 25mm chain guns and six crewed M2 .50 caliber machine guns. Depending on mission needs, gun mounts can hold M240 machine guns, M134 miniguns, and Mk 19 grenade launchers. The Mark VI is equipped with the MK50 Gun Weapon System (GWS), a shipboard version of the vehicle-mounted M153 CROWS remote turret that enables crewmen to use its camera and gun from the operator's station below deck. It is also planned to mount guided missiles such as the BGM-176B Griffin. Advanced lightweight armor plating is installed around key elements such as the crew compartment, engines and fuel tanks.

The aluminum-hulled Mark VI is powered by two MTU 16V2000M94 diesel engines connected to water jets that propel it faster than 35 knots (40 mph; 65 km/h), with a maximum range of 600 nmi (690 mi; 1,100 km). The reconfigurable main aft cabin can hold payloads such as Navy SEAL operators or a medical facility. The rear deck and stern is able to launch and recover small boats, unmanned aerial vehicles (UAVs), and unmanned undersea vehicles (UUVs). The craft's mast lowers to decrease overall height, allowing the craft to enter amphibious ship well decks. Mark VI can be transported and deployed by Navy amphibious ships such as landing helicopter docks, amphibious transport docks, and landing ship docks. Each Mark VI cost $15 million to build.

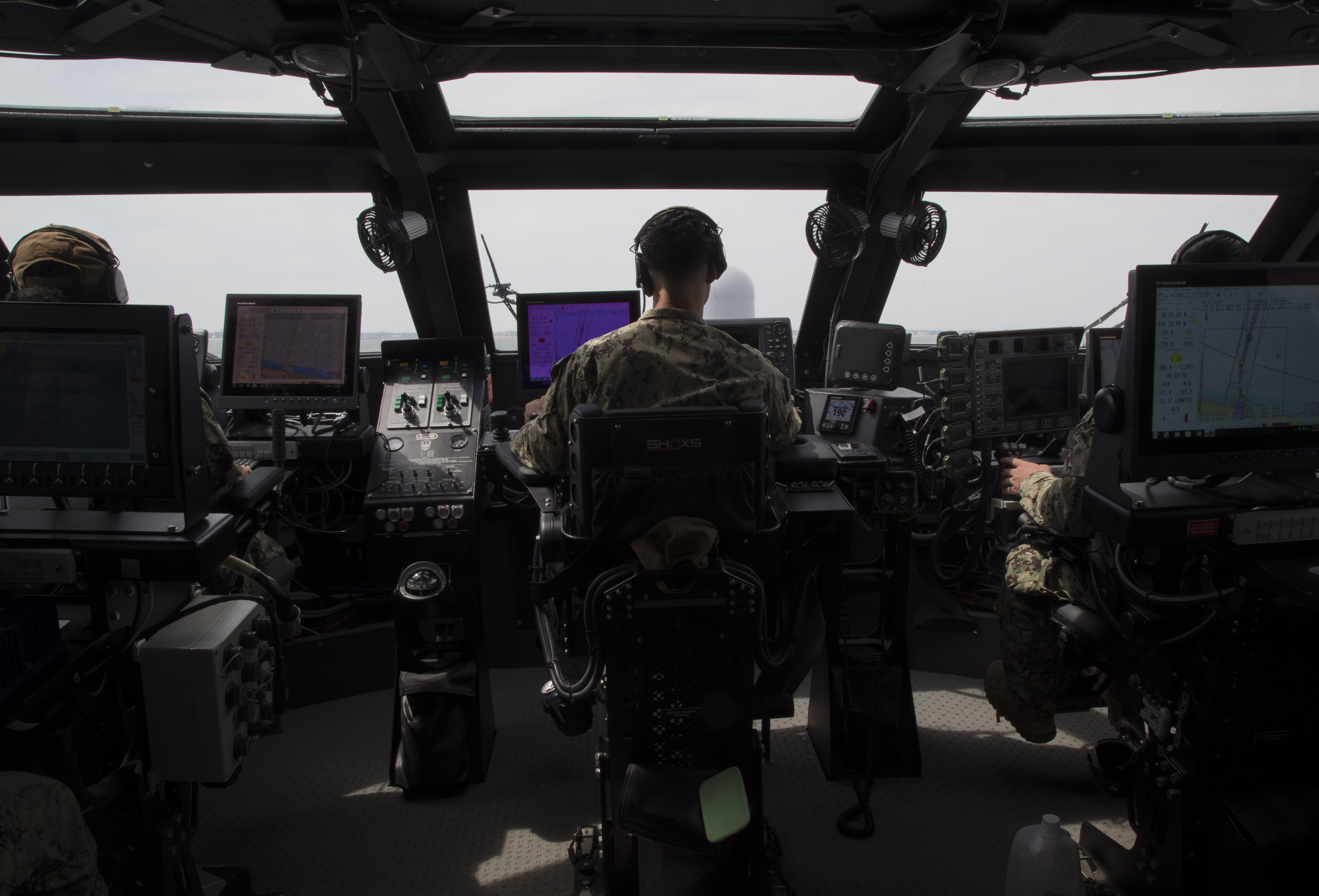
The Mark VI patrol boat pilot house

== Coastal Command Boat variant ==
The Coastal Command Boat (CCB) is a 'one-off' prototype of the Mk VI, delivered to the Navy in 2013 to aid in developing systems, procedures, and requirements for the Mark VI, which was under advanced development at that time. At 65 feet (20 m) long, it is somewhat smaller than the Mark VI. Its engine, armament, and other systems are otherwise identical to that of the Mark VI, though its smaller size gives it an endurance of over 24 hours at cruise speed.

It was deployed to the U.S. 5th Fleet in Bahrain in February 2014 to evaluate tactics and techniques for using the Mark VI in advance of the latter's planned deployment to Bahrain in 2016. It was assigned to Task Force 56 until it was returned to the United States for deactivation in 2018 following arrival of the third (and final) Mark VI craft in Bahrain. The Coastal Command Boat was not retained on active service due to its unique configuration as a developmental test craft, which posed challenges for logistical and parts support.

== Operators ==
- Ukraine - 12 Mark VI. U.S. State Department has approved 16 Mark VI orders. The boats will be built in Tacoma, Washington, and deliveries are expected to be completed by March 2026.
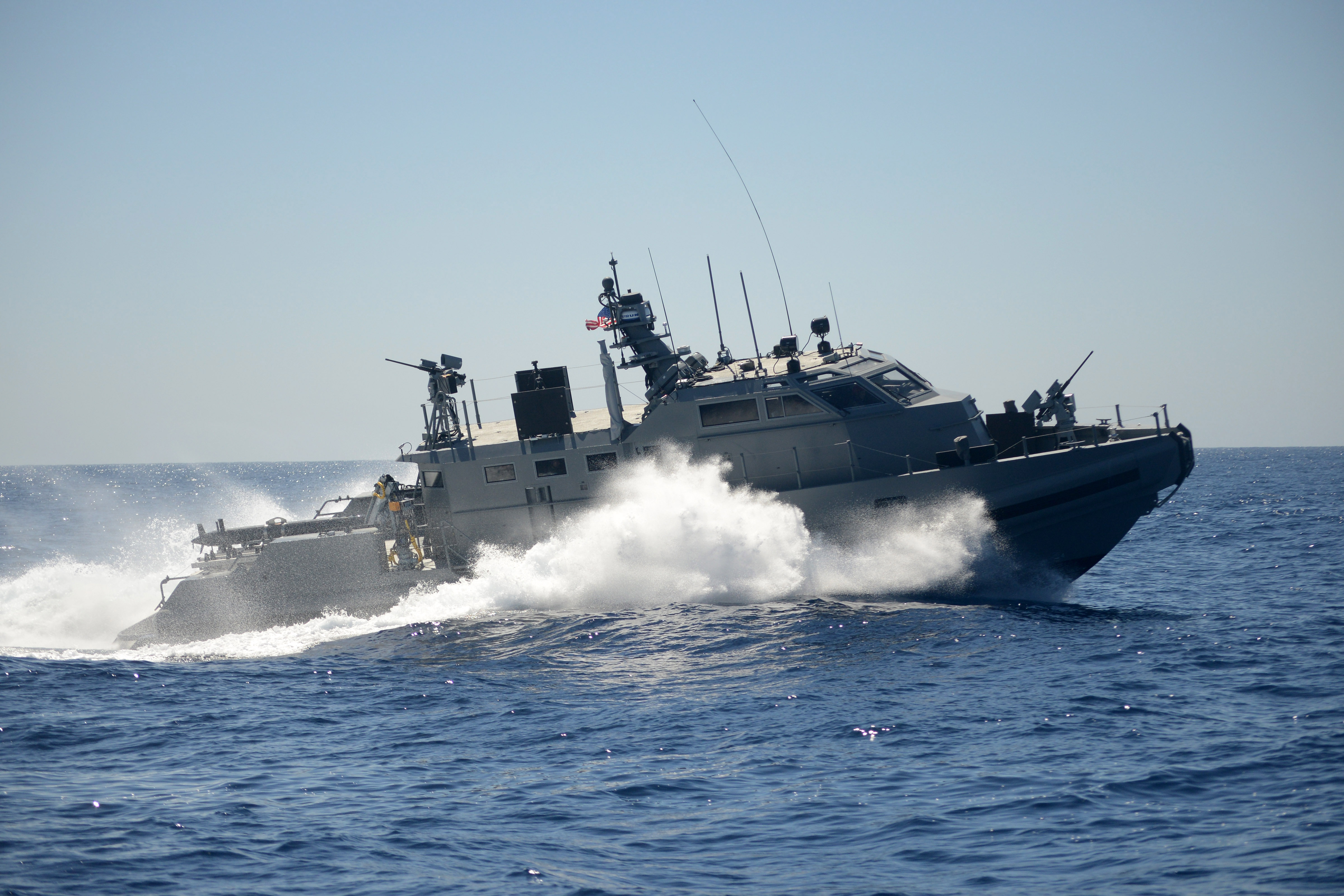
The CCB variant

== See also ==
- Cyclone-class patrol ship
- Combatant Craft Medium
