= Mark V Special Operations Craft =

Patrol Boat

MK V Special Operations Craft
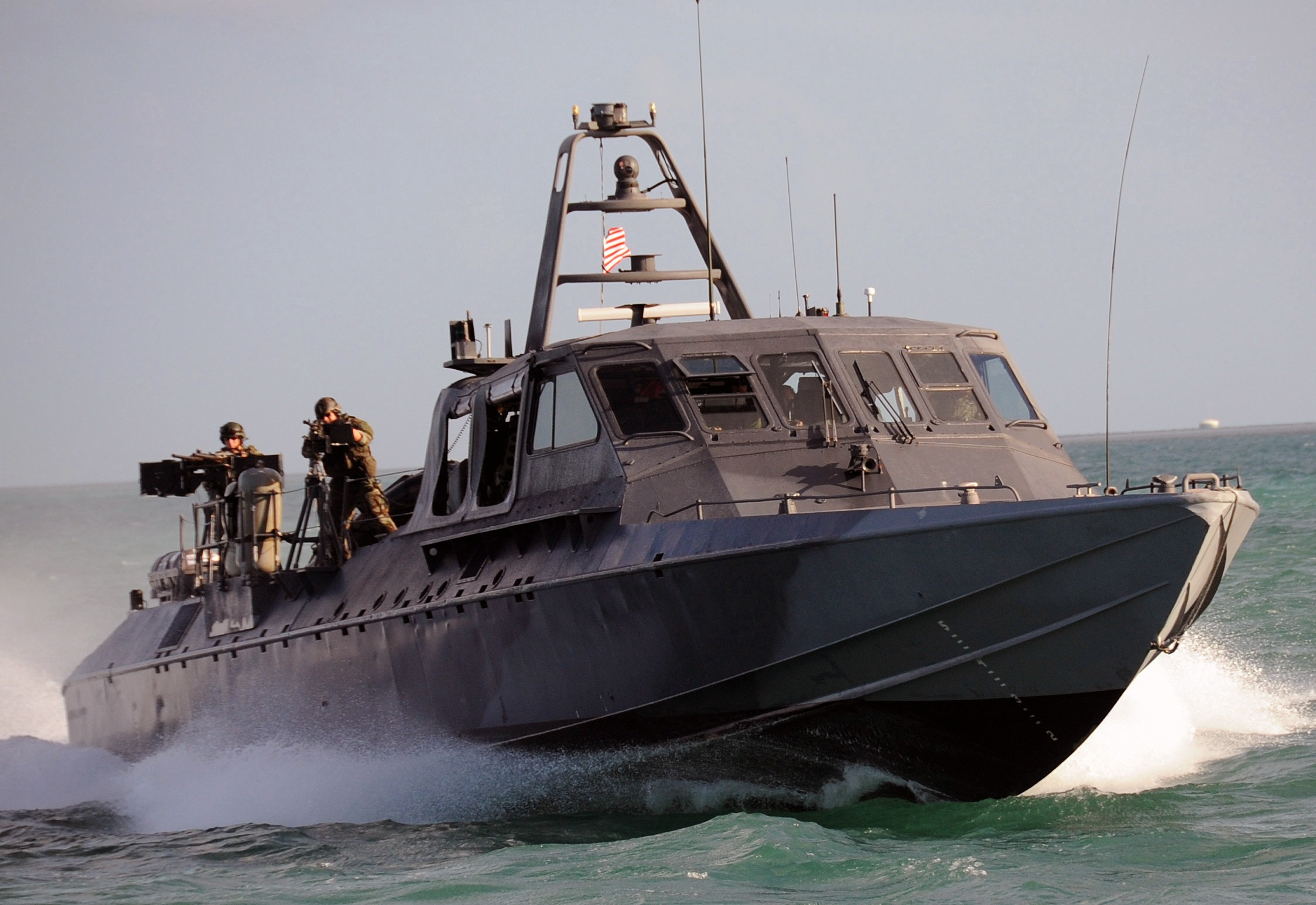
- A Mark V Special Operations Craft at Key West, Florida in 2009
- Place of origin: United States of America

Service history
- In service: 4 September 1995
- Used by: U.S. Naval Special Warfare Command; Hellenic Navy; Royal Saudi Navy; Kuwait Naval Force

Specifications
- Mass: 57+ tons
- Length: 25.0 m (82 ft)
- Width: 5.25 m (17.5 ft)
- Height: 5.25 m (17.5 ft); Draft: 1.5 m (5 ft)
- Armor: Mono hull, 5086 series aluminum
- Main armament: .50 caliber machine guns
- Secondary armament: 7.62mm machine guns
- Engine: 2× 2285 HP MTU 12V396 TE94 engines
- Payload capacity: >2,950 kg (>6,500 lbs)
- Fuel capacity: 9,840 L (2,600 gallons)
- Operational range: 500+ nautical miles
- Maximum speed: 50+ knots

The Mark V SOC (Special Operations Craft) was a marine security, patrol and special forces insertion boat used by the United States Navy and manufactured by VT Halter Marine Inc (Gulfport, Mississippi). It was introduced into service with the US Navy SEALs in 1995. It was removed from service in 2013.

It is commonly referred to as the "Mark V.1 Patrol Boat" in official U.S. Navy documents.

== Development ==
=== Origins ===
The development of the Mark V SOC was very fast-paced, taking only 18 months from the initiation of the program to the actual delivery of the first boat on September 4, 1995. The United States Special Operations Command (USSOCOM) Contracting Directorate and a dedicated Program Management team executed this effort in record time, specifically because USSOCOM was given Agency level contracting authority. The contract was fulfilled when the full operational capability was met in 1999. In all, 20 Mk V SOC units were delivered to USSOCOM at a unit cost of $3.7 million.

The Mark V SOC deployment was less smooth. Problems included instances of the windshield and entire pilothouse assembly collapsing upon wave impact. However, these issues have been resolved and the Mark V SOC has greatly improved maritime special operations capabilities.

The original Mk V SOC was designed to address the lack of any specifically conceived SEAL insertion craft. Prior to the Mk V SOC, SEALs traveled on any form of surface transport available, often resorting to taping lawn furniture to the available craft's deck. The original Mk V competition included three different designs, one Kevlar composite monohull, one aluminum monohull, and one aluminum catamaran hull; the aluminum monohull won. The Mk V SOC specifically incorporated a modular shock mitigation seating design to minimize injury.

Experience gained during training and operational usage showed the aluminum monohull transmitted the impact with the water to the craft's occupants more readily than a composite hull. Even after modifications such as the addition of shock-absorbing seats, the boats are capable of generating up to 20 Gs of force while slamming across waves. This led to many cases of bruises, sprained ankles, chipped teeth, and back, neck, and joint injuries. These injuries necessitated a replacement.

=== Redesign ===
On 11 January 2008 the U.S. Navy unveiled an experimental version of the Mark V Special Operations Craft, designated the Mk V.1, designed to reduce the number of injuries sustained by sailors and SEALs during the operation of the aluminum version of the vessel. Nicknamed the MAKO, the vessel was developed by a subsidiary of Hodgdon Yachts, in collaboration with the University of Maine's Advanced Engineered Wood Composites Center. It features a hull made of layers of carbon fiber, a foam core, and an outer layer of Kevlar for additional strength. It was constructed and launched at the Hodgdon Yachts' East Boothbay facility. The MAKO is lighter than the current Mk V. The Office of Naval Research funded the prototype "to compare the properties of composite construction with aluminum" versions of the same craft. The tests did not suggest continuing the vessel with a composite structure. Instead, the decision was to retire the Mark V in 2013 in favor of its replacements.

The Mark V was replaced in 2015 by several craft: the Combatant Craft Assault (CCA), Combatant Craft Medium (CCM MK1), and Combatant Craft Heavy (CCH MK1) SEALION (SEAL Insertion, Observation and Neutralization).

== Missions ==
The Mark V's primary mission is medium range insertion and extraction platform for Special Operations Forces (primarily SEAL combat swimmers) in a low to medium threat environment. The secondary mission is limited Coastal Patrol and Interdiction, specifically limited duration patrol and low to medium threat coastal interdiction. The typical Mark V SOC mission duration is 12 hours.

For example, in 2003, in one of the first actions of Operation Iraqi Freedom, Mark V SOCs operating out of Kuwait disembarked at least two platoons of Navy SEALs to capture Iraqi offshore oil terminals.

=== Capabilities ===
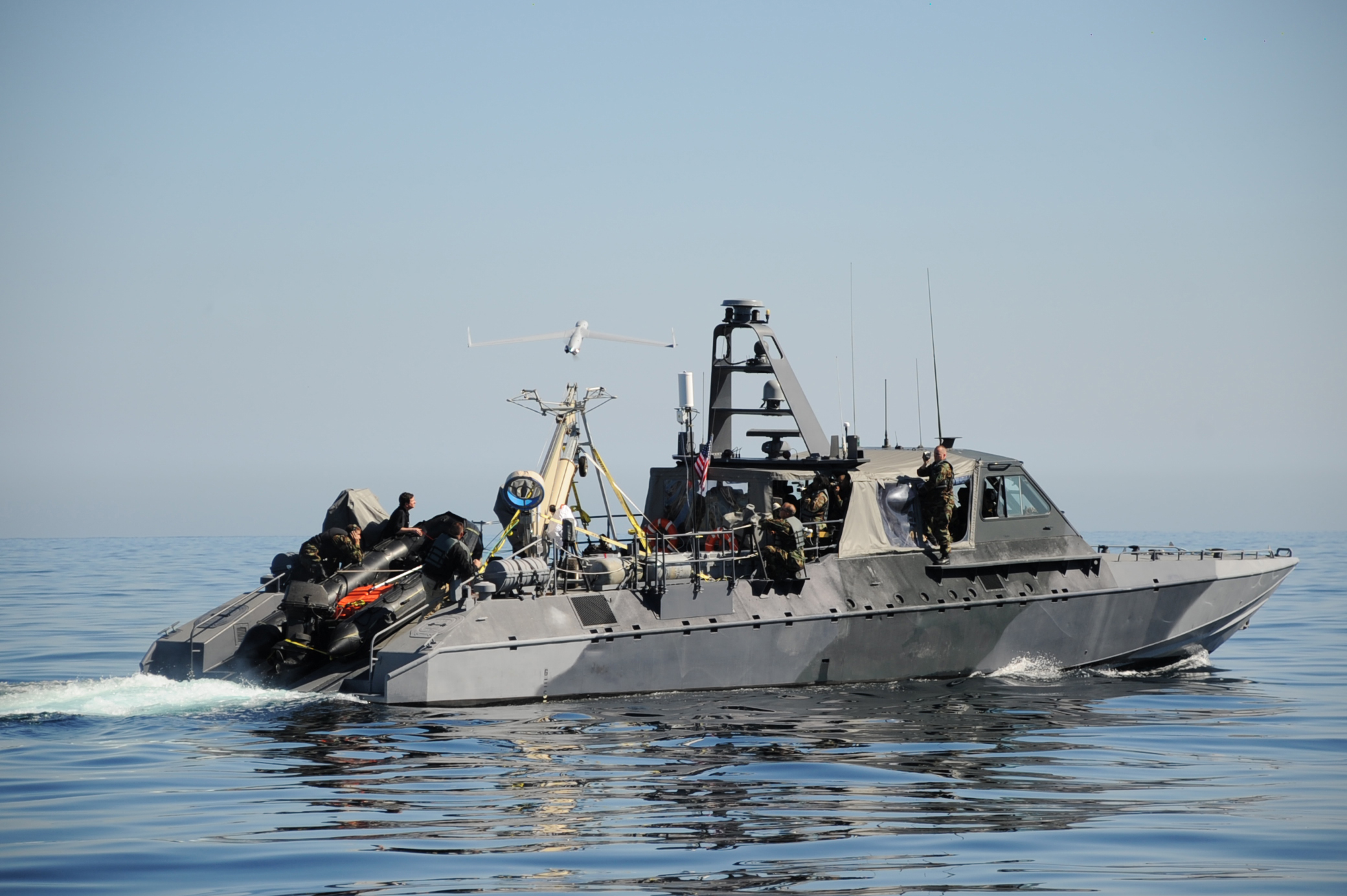
A Mark V SOC launching a ScanEagle UAV

The Mark V has the capacity to carry sixteen fully equipped SEALs to missions 500 miles (800 km) away from where they are based. They ride on seats that are designed for maximum comfort and shock mitigation in high seas or heavy maneuvering, and allows occupants to either stand or sit. With a beam of 17 1/2 feet, the craft has enough room to carry four Combat Rubber Raiding Crafts with six outboard motors (2 spares) and fuel, to deploy forces from a clandestine distance. The ramp on the stern allows SEAL teams to ride their CRRCs right up the stern of the boat, for fast extraction and insertion.

To support the SOF missions in a medium to low threat environment, the Mk Vs are outfitted with five gun mounts for small caliber weapons supporting any combination of: M-2 .50 cal heavy machine guns, M240 or the M60 7.62 mm machine guns or Mk19 40 mm automatic grenade launchers. Together these provide 360 degrees of firing coverage. To defend against aircraft, the craft has a station for firing the Stinger Man-portable Air Defense System (MANPADS). Later improvements include mounting stations for GAU-17 Miniguns, MK 95 Twin .50 cal machine gun, MK 38 chain gun and Mk48 25 mm guns. Personal small arms of the crew and passengers can also be used to defend the craft.

The Mark V has many special features, besides its weapons, that make it more survivable while delivering operators to their missions. Its angular design and low silhouette reduces its radar signature making it harder to spot and detect. Its V-hull design gives it good handling qualities in rough water as well as speed and shallow draft (four feet when cruising on-step). Its twin MTU 12-cylinder TE94 Diesel engines give it power and reliability and, coupled with the two K50S water jets, provides fast acceleration for operations near shore or in shallow waters as well as cutting down on the rooster tail effect that can make fast boats easier to see and track.

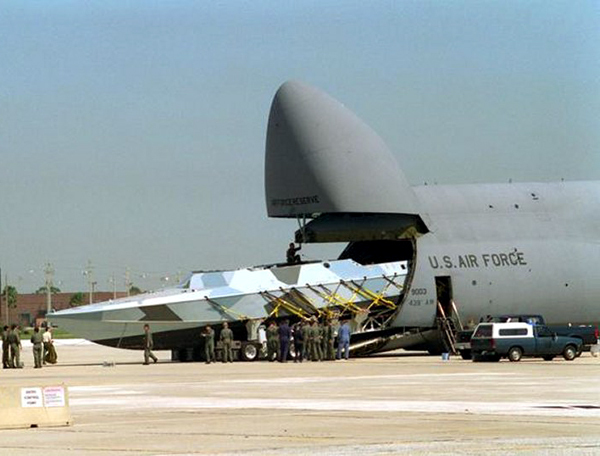
Transportable by C-5, 2011

=== Mark V SOC Detachment ===
The Mark V SOC will normally operate in a two craft detachment with a Mobile Support Team. The operational detachment—the basic Mark V SOC operating system—consists of:

- two Mark V special operations craft, each with a crew of five special warfare combatant-craft crewmen (also known as SWCCs);
- two Mark V SOC transporters, each with an M916A1E1 prime mover
- four M1097 HMMWVs with S250 shelters,
- two M1083 5-ton trucks for the 90-day containerized deployment support package (spare part, repair parts, consumables, etc.)
- one five-ton forklift;
- an eight-man maintenance support team, that provides technical assistance and maintenance support during mission turnaround.

A Mark V SOC detachment is deployable on two USAF C-5 Galaxy aircraft to a theater of operations within 48 hours of notification and is prepared to commence operations within 24 hours after arriving at a forward staging location. The detachment can also be delivered in-theater by well-deck- or flight-deck-equipped surface ships with appropriate crane and deck space capabilities, and, if appropriate, under their own power. A detachment is also transportable by road.

MK V during a helicopter insertion

The Mark V SOC is operated by Naval Special Warfare Group THREE (formerly known as Special Boat Squadron ONE) and Naval Special Warfare Group FOUR (formerly known as Special Boat Squadron TWO) on the east and west coasts. Twelve Mark Vs are assigned to NSWG-3, Coronado, California, and eight to NSWG-4, Little Creek, Virginia.

== Mark V Waterfront Operations Support Facility ==
Located at Naval Air Station North Island, San Diego, California is a facility to house operational maintenance, training and administrative functions for 12 Mark V SOC. The North Island location was designed to allow rapid mobilization and transport of these vessel worldwide. The facility provides non-depot level maintenance of rolling stock and depot level maintenance of the Mark V SOC. In addition to maintenance and supply/spare parts warehousing facilities, on-site administration and training facilities with classrooms and briefing areas were provided.

Final design includes a new 115' by 37' U-shaped, reinforced concrete pier, 60' long concrete floating docks to berth five vessels, and a gangway. The pier was designed to support the combined load of a 50-ton Mark V and a 70-ton marine travel lift used to lift the vessels out of the water and transport them to the maintenance facility.

The Support Facility building is Bldg 816 on Naval Air Station North Island, next to the Undersea Rescue Command compound. The project as executed does not seem to have included the dock and pier where shown in the planning documents. The facility is still is use, now apparently supporting CCM and other NSW craft.

== Foreign use ==
=== Kuwait ===
In 2009, the Kuwait Naval Force signed a $61.6-million contract with United States Marine, Inc. of Gulfport, MS for the design and construction of ten Mark V patrol boats under the Foreign Military Sales (FMS) program for coastal interdiction, and special operations for delivery by June 2013.

=== Saudi Arabia ===
On 9 July 2013, Congress was notified of a request from the Royal Saudi Naval Forces to purchase 30 Mark V patrol boats, along with associated equipment, parts, training, and logistical support for $1.2 billion. The boats' mission is to protect maritime infrastructure in Saudi littoral waters. They will be used primarily to patrol and interdict intruders in Saudi territorial seas, and recognized economic exclusion zones.

=== Greece ===
Four boats were delivered to Salamis Naval Base, Greece via the Excess Defense Articles programme on 6 April 2020 and are currently in use by the Underwater Demolition Command of the Hellenic Navy. They will receive the Typhoon MLS-ER weapons system on the stern deck with Spike-ER missiles as part of a deal between the Hellenic government and Rafael. The installation was completed in June 2026. Other upgrades include a new communications suite, navigation radar and FLIR electro-optical sensor, which were carried out by the Hellenic Navy.

== Private owners ==
The Mark V Special Operations Craft (SOC)'s first known civilian owner is Palmer Luckey, the founder of Oculus VR and defense technology company Anduril Industries. Luckey acquired the vessel in 2019. The craft was previously used by the United States Naval Special Warfare Command for maritime special operations.

In May 2026, the YouTube channel P45 Equipment LLC bought a Mark V and intends to restore it in their facility in Charlevoix, Michigan.

== See also ==
- Combatant Craft Medium
- Cyclone-class patrol ship
- Special Operations Craft – Riverine
- CB90-class fast assault craft
- Mark VI patrol boat
