= Combatant Craft Medium =

United States Navy ship class

Combatant Craft Medium, Mk1 (CCM)
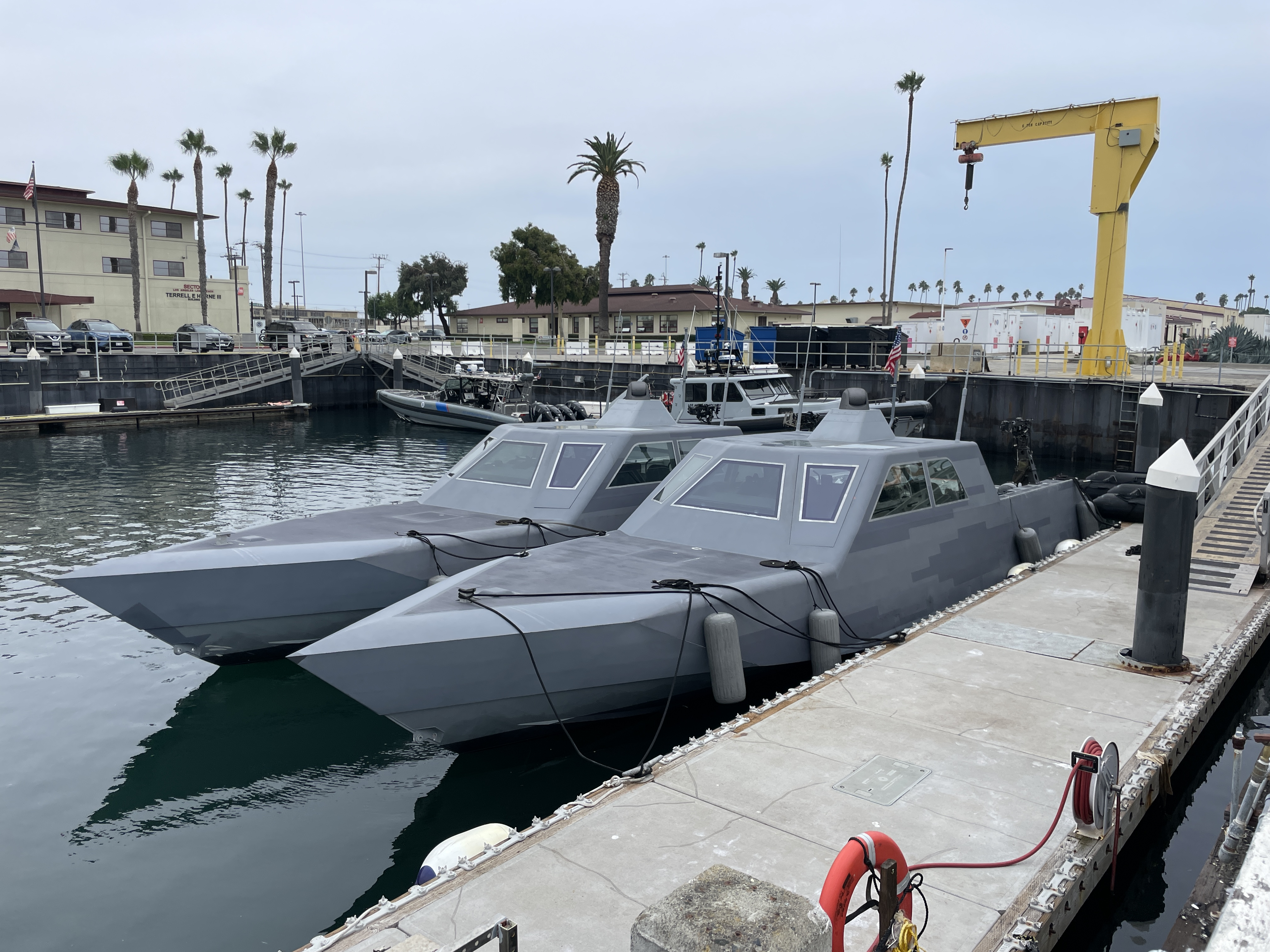
- 2 CCM Mk1's at the dock

Class overview
- Builders: Vigor Marine Group
- Operators: United States Navy
- Preceded by: Mark V Special Operations Craft
- Cost: US$11 million
- Built: 2014–2021
- Planned: 35
- Completed: 31

General characteristics
- Type: Patrol boat
- Displacement: 59,600 lb (27,000 kg) (30 tons)
- Length: 18.47 m (60 ft 7 in)
- Beam: 4.01 m (13 ft 2 in)
- Draft: 1 m (3 ft 3 in)
- Installed power: 2 × 1,250 hp (930,000 W)
- Propulsion: 2 × MTU 8V2000 M94 (diesel engines); 2 × ZF SeaRex 120S (surface thrusters)
- Speed: > 52 knots (96 km/h; 60 mph)
- Range: 600 nmi (1,100 km; 690 mi); (at 40 knots (74 km/h; 46 mph))
- Troops: 19
- Complement: 4 crew
- Armament: Swappable weapons systems including mounting points for a bow mounted .50 cal remote weapon station, and rear mounted M2HB, M240G, and Mk 19 grenade launchers.
- Armor: Arms resistant double aluminium hull

The Combatant Craft Medium, Mark1 (CCM) is a United States Navy patrol boat designed for use by the United States Naval Special Warfare Command as a multi-mission surface tactical mobility craft built by Vigor Industrial "to provide small-caliber gunfire support, infiltrate and exfiltrate Special Operation Forces, conduct VBSS (visit, board, search, and seizure), special reconnaissance, coastal patrol and interdiction, counter-terrorism, and FID (Foreign Internal Defense)", per the U.S. Navy.

== Development ==
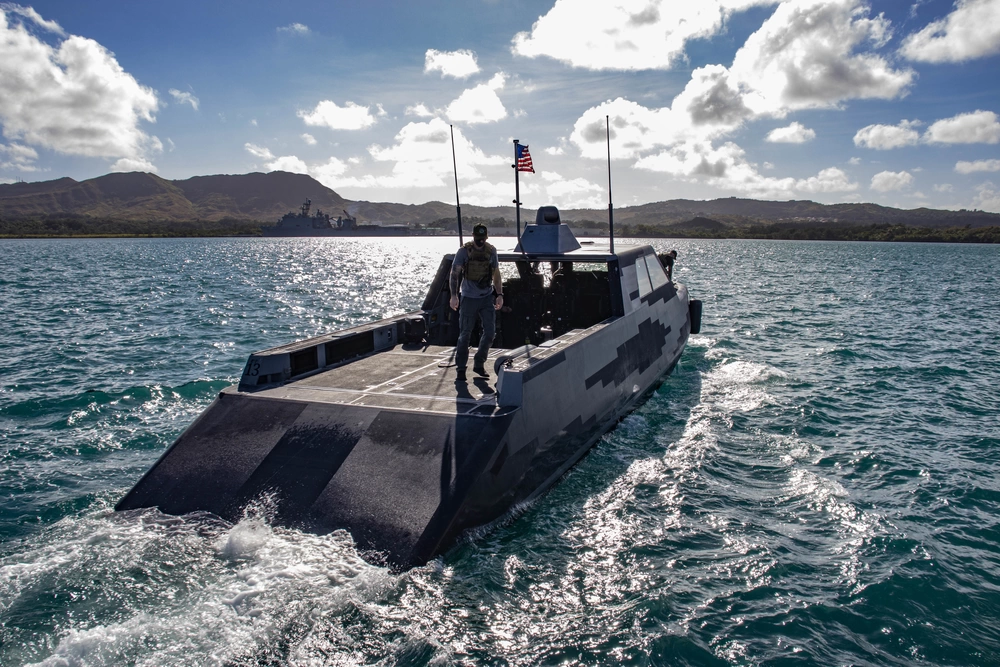
Rear view of a CCM MkI

Initially conceived as a replacement of the now retired Mark V Special Operations Craft until that RFP was canceled in April 2010. The revised proposal specified a C-17 transportable replacement for the discontinued Naval Special Warfare rigid hull inflatable boats (RHIB), which were originally transportable on the smaller C-130 aircraft.

Designed by Michael Peters Yacht Design, the CCM evolved from Oregon Iron Works' Alligator and Sealion concepts, initially in cooperation with Israel Defense Forces. Oregon Iron Works and United States Marine, Inc were awarded initial contracts to develop their existing concepts into the CCM in September 2011, with Oregon Iron Works winning the selection process to produce a total of 35 CCMs over 7 years by United States Special Operations Command in February 2014.

In May 2014, Oregon Iron Works announced its merger with fellow Oregon shipbuilder Vigor Industrial in order to facilitate the $400 million contract, as well as subcontracting marine electronics systems to Leidos.

The first CCMs were delivered and commissioned in 2015, featuring a low observable profile, with longer range, operable in higher sea states, and with increased protection and shock mitigation for its crew and passengers than the NSW RHIBs it replaces. Its electronics package includes a remote weapon station and sensors, Blue Force Tracker, a DAGR jam-resistant GPS receiver, and advanced tactical radios. Each hull is individually numbered, though not named; the vessels are operated by SWCC Boat Teams.

In May 2023, it was announced that Norway's Naval Special Operations Command gained approval from the Pentagon to acquire 2 CCMs to be delivered in 2025.
