= United States Naval Special Warfare Command =

Naval component of United States Special Operations Command

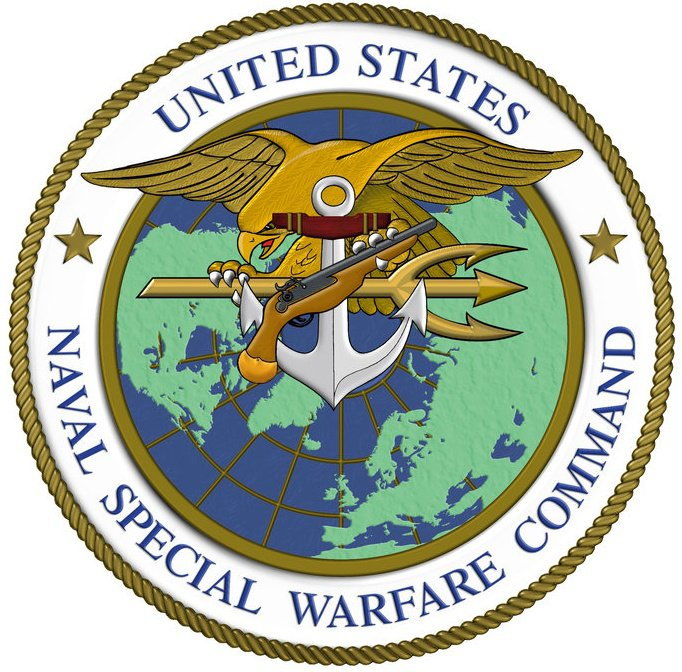
- Naval Special Warfare Command official seal
- Active: 16 April 1987 – present
- Country: United States
- Branch: United States Navy
- Type: Special operations
- Role: Amphibious warfare Amphibious reconnaissance Direct action Riverine Warfare; Underwater demolition
- Size: 10,000+ positions authorized: ≈3,000 SEAL operators; ≈755 SWCC crewman; 4,600 combat support and combat service support personnel; ≈700 reservists; 1,200 civilians
- Part of: U.S. Special Operations Command
- Headquarter: Naval Amphibious Base Coronado, San Diego County, California, U.S. Joint Expeditionary Base–Little Creek, Virginia Beach, Virginia, U.S.
- Engagements: Operation Earnest Will; Operation Prime Chance; Operation Just Cause: Operation Nifty Package; Operation Desert Storm; Operation Restore Hope; Operation Gothic Serpent: Battle of Mogadishu; Operation Uphold Democracy; Operation Enduring Freedom: War in Afghanistan; Operation Red Wings; Operation Enduring Freedom – Horn of Africa; Operation Ocean Shield; 2013 raid on Barawe; Operation Enduring Freedom – Philippines; Siege of Marawi; Operation Iraqi Freedom: Battle of Al Faw; Battle of Umm Qasr; Battle of Ramadi; War in North-West Pakistan Operation Inherent Resolve
- Website: https://www.nsw.navy.mil/

Commanders
- Commander: Rear Admiral Walter H. Allman III
- Deputy Commander: Rear Admiral Andrew J. Schreiner
- Command Senior Enlisted Leader: Master Chief Petty Officer Patrick C. West

The United States Naval Special Warfare Command (USNSWC), also known as NAVSPECWARCOM and WARCOM, is the naval component of United States Special Operations Command, the unified command that oversees and conducts the nation's special operations and missions.

Originating in the unconventional naval units formed during World War II, WARCOM was established on 16 April 1987 at Naval Amphibious Base Coronado in San Diego, California. Its mission is to provide leadership, doctrinal guidance, resources, and oversight to special operations carried out in maritime and littoral environments. WARCOM specializes in a broad range of tactical areas, including unconventional warfare, direct action, counterterrorism, special reconnaissance, and personnel recovery.

WARCOM is organized primarily around eight Navy SEAL teams, three special boat teams, and various supporting commands, totaling about 9,200 personnel. Units can operate independently, as part of carrier battle groups and amphibious ready groups, or integrated with other U.S. special operations forces. By using the United States Navy's ships, submarines, and overseas facilities, WARCOM forces can be deployed rapidly around the world.

== Background ==
Today's U.S. Navy special warfare operators trace their origins to various units formed during World War II, including the Scouts and Raiders, Naval Combat Demolition Units, Office of Strategic Services Operational Swimmers, Underwater Demolition Teams, and Motor Torpedo Boat Squadrons. In the Vietnam era, the Navy's special units included separate Underwater Demolition Teams (the successors to Navy Combat Demolition Units) and SEAL teams (successors to Scouts and Raiders). In 1983, the Underwater Demolition Teams were merged into the SEAL teams.

A detailed history of Naval Special Warfare, including writings by members who have served in the various NSW units, is available at the National Navy UDT-SEAL Museum website, while the facility itself has an extensive collection of related artifacts on display.

=== World War II ===
By the time the United States became involved in World War II, Adolf Hitler and the Axis forces had control over a large portion of Europe, Asia and North Africa. If the Allied forces were to stand a chance, there would have to be several full-scale landings. The U.S. Navy decided that to do the job right required sending in their own. They needed men to reconnoiter the landing beaches, take note of obstacles and defenses and ultimately guide the landing forces in. Later, during the war, the Army Engineers passed demolition jobs to the U.S. Navy. They were to clear any obstacles and/or defenses in the nearshore area, beginning a tradition that continues today.

==== Scouts and Raiders ====
The Navy Scouts and Raiders were created before the Navy Combat Demolition Units (NCDUs). The Scouts and Raiders were first formed 15 August 1942, nine months after the attack on Pearl Harbor, from the Observer Group, a joint Marine Corps–Army–Navy unit. The Observer Group was the first unit trained in amphibious reconnaissance. They trained in inflatable boat insertions from submarines around the Chesapeake Bay and at the Amphibious Training Base (ATB) Little Creek in Virginia and in Fort Pierce, Florida. They were training for an intense clandestine mission in North Africa.

With US Marines limited to the Pacific Theatre of Operations, the Observer Group was disbanded, with the Marine Corps counterpart forming the Amphib Recon Company; the Army/Navy unit formed the Scouts and Raiders with the Army later leaving. The U.S. Navy began the Scouts and Raiders to provide reconnaissance and raiding missions to support amphibious landings. The unit utilized two men to platoon-sized operations to conduct raids and sabotage missions.

The unit continued its deployment to North Africa as planned, where they earned eight Navy Crosses. Robert Halperin, a former NFL football player and future Olympic medalist, received a Presidential Citation and the Navy Cross for his work during the amphibious landings in French Morocco. This was just the first of many war-time missions for the versatile Scouts and Raiders.

===== First group =====
The first group included Phil H. Bucklew, the "Father of Naval Special Warfare", after whom the Naval Special Warfare Center building is named. Commissioned in October 1942, this group saw combat in November 1942 during Operation Torch on the North African coast. Scouts and Raiders also supported landings in Sicily, Salerno, Anzio, Normandy, and southern France.

===== Second group =====
A combined operations joint US-Australian unit, Special Service Unit No. 1 (SSU 1), was established on 7 July 1943. Its first mission, in September 1943, was at Finschafen on New Guinea. Later operations were at Gasmata, Arawe, Cape Gloucester, and the East and South coast of New Britain, all without any loss of personnel. Conflicts arose over operational matters, and the unit was dissolved.

The US Navy personnel from SSU 1 became the basis of the 7th Amphibious Scouts. They received a new mission, to go ashore with the assault boats, mark channels with buoys, erect markers for the incoming craft, handle casualties, take offshore soundings, blow up beach obstacles, and maintain voice communications linking the troops ashore, incoming boats, and nearby ships. The 7th Amphibious Scouts conducted operations in the Pacific for the duration of the conflict, participating in more than 40 landings.

Scout landings were done at night during the new moon. The men were brought to a lagoon by submarine and came ashore with rubber paddle boats. They would bury the boats in the sand and begin recon. Their mission was to clear the area prior to the main Naval landing which would then take over the island. They stayed from three days to as long as seven days engaging in covert operations and "taking no prisoners". They had learned martial arts (judo) and were armed with Thompson submachine guns, sidearms and knives. The entire Navy Scouts program was strictly volunteer, since it was considered too dangerous to order men to do this job. When the island was secured, they would transmit code to the sub, which would pick them up the next night. A typical loss would be 12 men going in and 3–5 coming back alive. Sometimes only one would come back.

===== Third group =====
The third Scout and Raiders organization deployed to fight with the Sino-American Cooperative Organization (SACO) in China. Admiral Ernest J. King ordered that 120 officers and 900 enlisted sailors be trained for "Amphibious Roger" at the Amphibious Roger school at Fort Pierce, Florida in order to support this mission. They formed the core of what was envisioned as a "guerrilla amphibious organization of Americans and Chinese operating from coastal waters, lakes and rivers employing small steamboats and sampans." Elements of the third Scouts and Raiders saw active service conducting surveys of the upper Yangtze River in the spring of 1945 and, disguised as coolies, conducting a detailed three-month survey of the Chinese coast from Shanghai to Kitchioh Wan, near Hong Kong. The majority of the force remained garrisoned at Camp Knox in Calcutta, India.

=== Naval Combat Demolition Units ===
In September 1942, 17 Navy salvage personnel arrived at ATB Little Creek, Virginia for a one-week concentrated course on demolitions, explosive cable cutting and commando raiding techniques. The units were organised into six-man teams of an officer, a petty officer and four seamen using a seven-man LCRS inflatable boat to carry their explosives and gear.

On 10 November 1942, this first combat demolition unit succeeded in cutting a cable and net barrier across the Wadi Sebou River during Operation Torch in North Africa. Their actions enabled USS Dallas to traverse the river and insert Army Rangers, who proceeded to capture the Port Lyautey aerodrome.

Plans for a massive cross-channel invasion of Europe had begun and intelligence indicated that the Germans were placing extensive underwater obstacles on the beaches at Normandy. On 7 May 1943, Lieutenant Commander Draper L. Kauffman, "The Father of Naval Combat Demolition," was directed to set up a school and train people to eliminate obstacles on an enemy-held beach prior to an invasion. On 6 June 1943, LCDR Kaufmann established Naval Combat Demolition Unit training at Fort Pierce. By April 1944, a total of 34 NCDUs were deployed to England in preparation for Operation OVERLORD, the amphibious landing at Normandy.

On 6 June 1944, in the face of great adversity, the NCDUs at Omaha Beach managed to blow eight complete gaps and two partial gaps in the German defenses. The NCDUs suffered 31 killed and 60 wounded, a casualty rate of 52%. Meanwhile, the NCDUs at Utah Beach met less intense enemy fire. They cleared 700 yards (640 m) of beach in two hours, another 900 yards (820 m) by the afternoon. Casualties at Utah Beach were significantly lighter with six killed and eleven wounded. During Operation OVERLORD, not a single demolitioneer was lost to improper handling of explosives.

In August 1944, NCDUs from Utah Beach participated in the landings in southern France, the last amphibious operation in the European Theater of Operations. NCDUs also operated in the Pacific theater. NCDU 2, under LTjg Frank Kaine, after whom the Naval Special Warfare Command building is named, and NCDU 3 under LTjg Lloyd Anderson, formed the nucleus of six NCDUs that served with the Seventh Amphibious Force tasked with clearing boat channels after the landings from Biak to Borneo.

=== OSS Operational Swimmers ===
Some of the earliest World War II predecessors of the SEALs were the Operational Swimmers of the Office of Strategic Services, or OSS. Many present day SEAL missions were first assigned to them. The OSS specialized in special operations, dropping operatives behind enemy lines to engage in organized guerrilla warfare as well as to gather information on such things as enemy resources and troop movements.

British Combined Operations veteran Lt Cdr Wooley, of the Royal Navy, was placed in charge of the OSS Maritime Unit in June 1943. Their training started in November 1943 at Camp Pendleton, California, moved to Santa Catalina Island, California in January 1944, and finally moved to the warmer waters of The Bahamas in March 1944. Within the U.S. military, they pioneered flexible swimfins and diving masks, closed-circuit diving equipment (under the direction of Dr. Chris Lambertsen), the use of Swimmer Delivery Vehicles (a type of submersible), and combat swimming and limpet mine attacks.

In May 1944, General Donovan, the head of the OSS, divided the unit into groups. He loaned Group 1, under Lieutenant Arthur Choate Jr., to Admiral Nimitz, as a way to introduce the OSS into the Pacific theater. They became part of UDT-10 in July 1944, with Lt. Commander Choate commanding the unit. Five OSS men participated in the very first UDT submarine operation with the USS Burrfish (SS-312) in the Caroline Islands in August 1944.

=== Underwater Demolition Teams ===
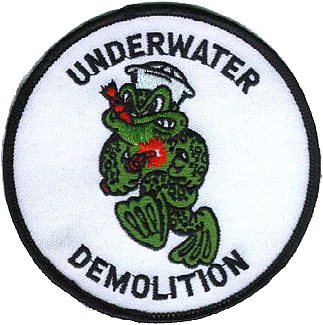
Patch of the Underwater Demolition Teams

On 23 November 1943, the U.S. Marine landing and the subsequent battle at Tarawa Atoll emphasized the need for hydrographic reconnaissance and underwater demolition of obstacles prior to any amphibious landing. After Tarawa, 30 officers and 150 enlisted men were moved to the Waimānalo Amphibious Training Base to form the nucleus of a demolition training program. This group became Underwater Demolition Teams (UDT) One and Two.

The UDTs saw their first combat on 31 January 1944, during Operation Flintlock in the Marshall Islands. FLINTLOCK became the real catalyst for the UDT training program in the Pacific Theater. In February 1944, the Naval Combat Demolition Training and Experimental Base was established at Kīhei, Maui, next to the Amphibious Base at Kamaole. Eventually, 34 UDT teams were established. Wearing swim suits, fins, and dive masks on combat operations, these "Naked Warriors" saw action across the Pacific in every major amphibious landing including: Eniwetok, Saipan, Guam, Tinian, Angaur, Ulithi, Peleliu, Leyte, Lingayen Gulf, Zambales, Iwo Jima, Okinawa, Labuan, Brunei Bay, and on 4 July 1945 at Balikpapan on Borneo, which was the last UDT demolition operation of the war.

The rapid demobilization at the conclusion of the war reduced the number of active duty UDTs to two on each coast with a complement of seven officers and 45 enlisted men each.

The Korean War began on 25 June 1950, when the North Korean army invaded South Korea. Beginning with a detachment of 11 personnel from UDT 3, UDT participation expanded to three teams with a combined strength of 300 men. As part of the Special Operations Group, or SOG, UDTs successfully conducted demolition raids on railroad tunnels and bridges along the Korean coast. On 15 September 1950, UDTs supported Operation Chromite, the amphibious landing at Incheon. UDT 1 and 3 provided personnel who went in ahead of the landing craft, scouting mud flats, marking low points in the channel, clearing fouled propellers, and searching for mines. Four UDT personnel acted as wave-guides for the Marine landing.

In October 1950, UDTs supported mine-clearing operations in Wonsan Harbor where frogmen would locate and mark mines for minesweepers. On 12 October 1950, two U.S. minesweepers hit mines and sank. UDTs rescued 25 sailors.

The UDT's entered the Vietnam War in 1958, UDTs delivered small watercraft far up the Mekong River into Laos. In 1961, naval advisers started training South Vietnamese personnel in South Vietnam. The men were called the Liên Đoàn Người Nhái (LDNN) or Vietnamese Frogmen, which translates as "Frogmen Team."

UDT teams carried out hydrographic surveys in South Vietnam's coastal waters and reconnaissance missions of harbors, beaches and rivers often under hazardous conditions and enemy fire.

Later, the UDTs supported the Amphibious Ready Groups operating on South Vietnam's rivers creating a River Patrol Force (Task Force 116) of UDT's that operated River Patrol Boats. UDTs manned riverine patrol craft and help went ashore to demolish obstacles and enemy bunkers. They operated throughout South Vietnam, from the Mekong Delta (Sea Float), the Parrot's Beak and French canal AO's through I Corps and the Song Cui Dai estuary south of Da Nang. UDT's provided infiltration and extraction for assigned SEAL team assault squads along the rivers.

== Navy SEALs and SWCC ==
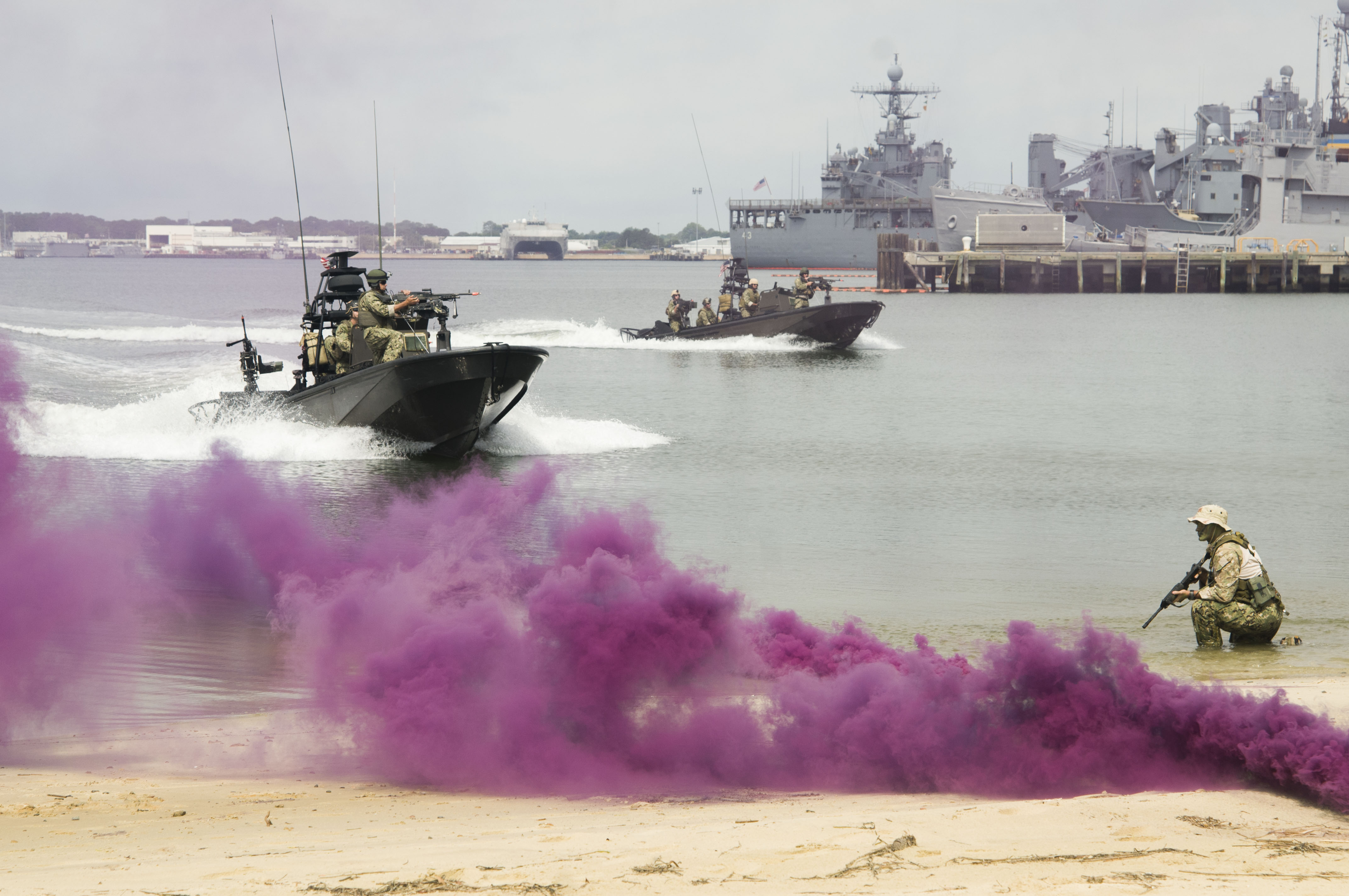
Members of SEAL Team 18

Naval Special Warfare personnel make up less than one percent of U.S. Navy personnel. Navy Sea, Air, and Land (SEAL) and Special Warfare Combat Crewmen (SWCC) units operate across the spectrum of conflict and in operations other than war. Their abilities to provide real time intelligence and "eyes on target" offer decision makers immediate options in the face of changing world crises.

=== SEALs ===
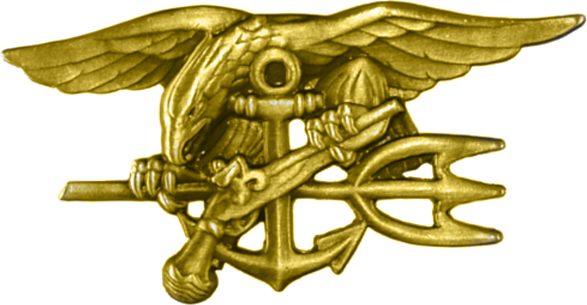
Navy Special Warfare Trident Insignia worn by qualified U.S. Navy SEALs.

SEALs are Special Operations Command's force-of-choice to conduct small-unit maritime military operations which originate from, and return to a river, ocean, swamp, delta or coastline. This littoral capability is considered more important now than ever, as half the world's infrastructure and population is located within one mile (1.6 km) of an ocean or river.

Responding to President John F. Kennedy's desire for the Services to develop an Unconventional Warfare (UW) capability, the U.S. Navy established SEAL Team One and SEAL Team Two in January 1962. Formed entirely with personnel from Underwater Demolition Teams, the SEALs mission was to conduct counter guerrilla warfare and clandestine operations in maritime and riverine environments.

SEAL candidates begin BUD/S training at the Naval Special Warfare Center, NAB Coronado, California. This six-month course of instruction focuses on physical conditioning, small boat handling, diving physics, basic diving techniques, land warfare, weapons, demolitions, communications, and reconnaissance.

- First Phase trains, develops, and assesses SEAL candidates in physical conditioning, water competency, teamwork, and mental tenacity.
- Second (Diving) Phase trains, develops, and qualifies SEAL candidates as competent basic combat swimmers. During this period, physical training continues and becomes even more intensive. Emphasis is placed on long distance underwater dives with the goal of training students to become basic combat divers, using swimming and diving techniques as a means of transportation from their launch point to their combat objective. This is a skill that separates SEALs from all other Special Operations forces.
- Third Phase trains, develops, and qualifies SEAL candidates in basic weapons, demolition, and small unit tactics. Third Phase concentrates on teaching land navigation, small-unit tactics, patrolling techniques, rappelling, marksmanship, and military explosives. The final three and a half weeks of Third Phase are spent at NALF San Clemente Island, where students apply all the techniques they have acquired during training.

==== SEAL Delivery Vehicle Teams ====
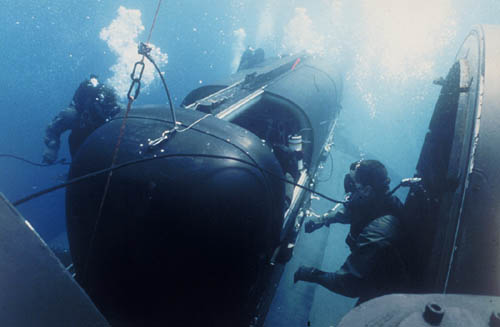
SEALs using a SEAL Delivery Vehicle

SEAL Delivery Vehicle Teams' (SDVT) historical roots began during WWII with the earliest human torpedoes to see use: Maiale, used by Italy's Decima Flottiglia MAS, and Chariots, used by British commando frogmen. Naval Special Warfare entered the wet submersible field in the 1960s when the Coastal Systems Center in Panama City, Florida developed the Mark 7, a free-flooding SDV of the type used today, and the first SDV to be used in the fleet. The Mark 8 and 9 followed in the late 1970s.

Today's Mark 8 Mod 1 provides NSW with an unprecedented capability that combines the attributes of clandestine underwater mobility and the combat swimmer. The Advanced SEAL Delivery System (ASDS) program that would have provided NSW a new (dry) submersible for long range infiltration missions was abandoned in 2009. However, news reports have stated that USSOCOM have purchased a new dry SEAL Delivery Vehicle called the Dry Combat Submersible and will be become operational around 2018/2019.

=== Special Warfare Combat Crewmen ===
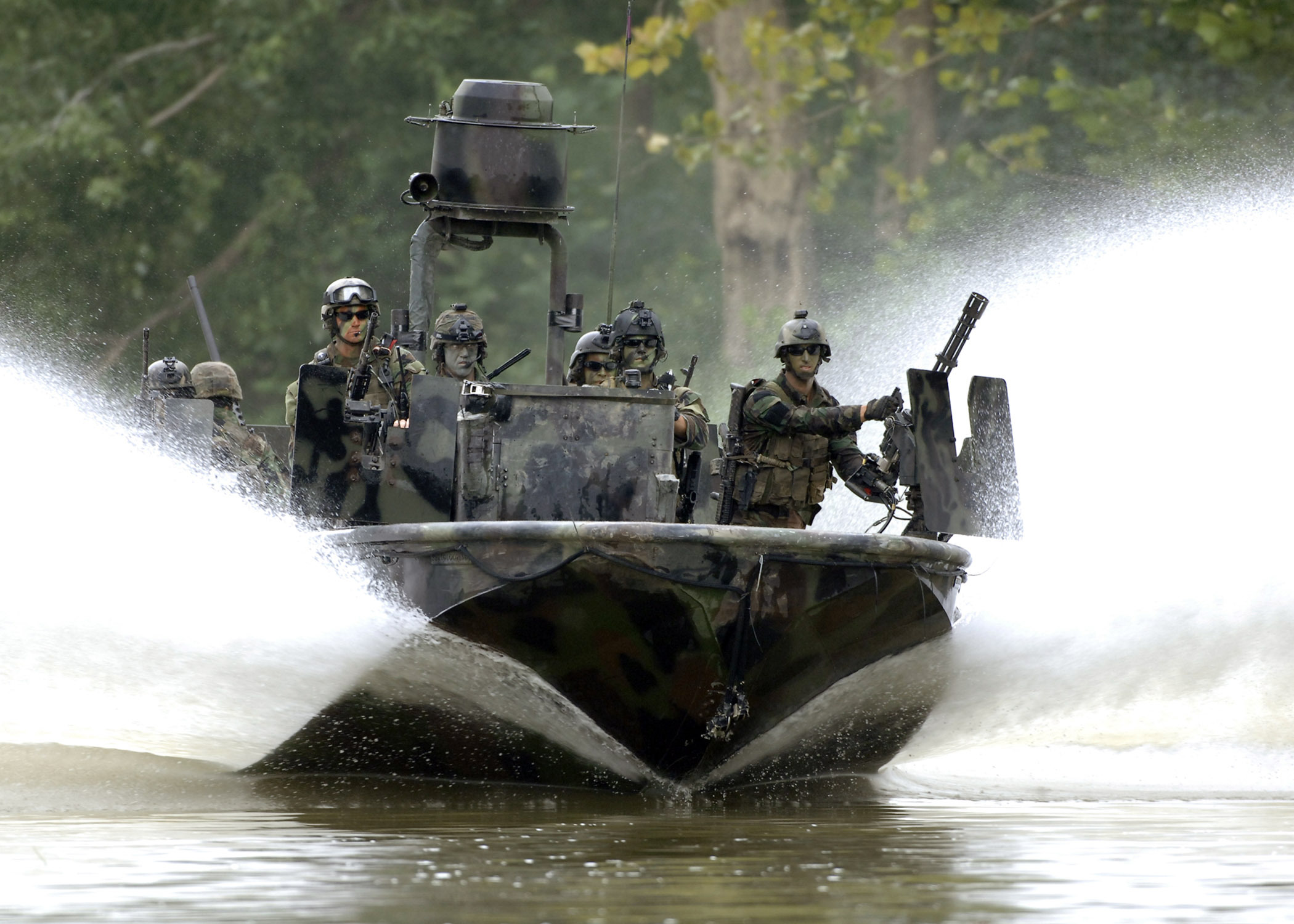
Special Warfare Combat Crewmen (SWCC) in the Special Operations Craft-Riverine

The exclusive mission of Special Warfare Combat Crewmen (SWCC) operators is to expertly drive and provide large-caliber gunfire support on specialized high-tech, high-speed, and low-profile Surface Combatant Craft to secretly infiltrate and exfiltrate Navy SEALs on Special Operations missions worldwide. These missions include direct action on land, sea, coastline or rivers (such as strikes, captures, and ship take downs by Visit, Board, Search, and Seizure), special reconnaissance, coastal patrol and interdiction of suspect ships and surface craft, counter-terrorism operations, riverine warfare, deception operations, search and rescue operations, and foreign internal defense missions. Although SEALs and SWCC undergo different training programs, both are focused on special operations in maritime environments. The SWCC program includes extensive training on craft and weapons tactics, techniques, and procedures. Like SEALs, SWCC must show physical fitness, possess strong motivation, be combat focused, and maintain responsiveness in high stress situations.

The SWCC designation is a relatively new Naval Special Warfare career path that is independent of the regular line Navy. Today's Special Boat Teams have their origins in the PT boats of WWII and the "Brown Water" naval force onset of the Vietnam War in 1965 that later birthed the River Patrol Force (Task Force 116) of UDT's and various sailors that supported SEALs along the rivers. Patrol Coastal and Patrol Torpedo ships are the ancestors of today's Cyclone-class patrol ships and Mark V Special Operations Craft.

== Structure ==
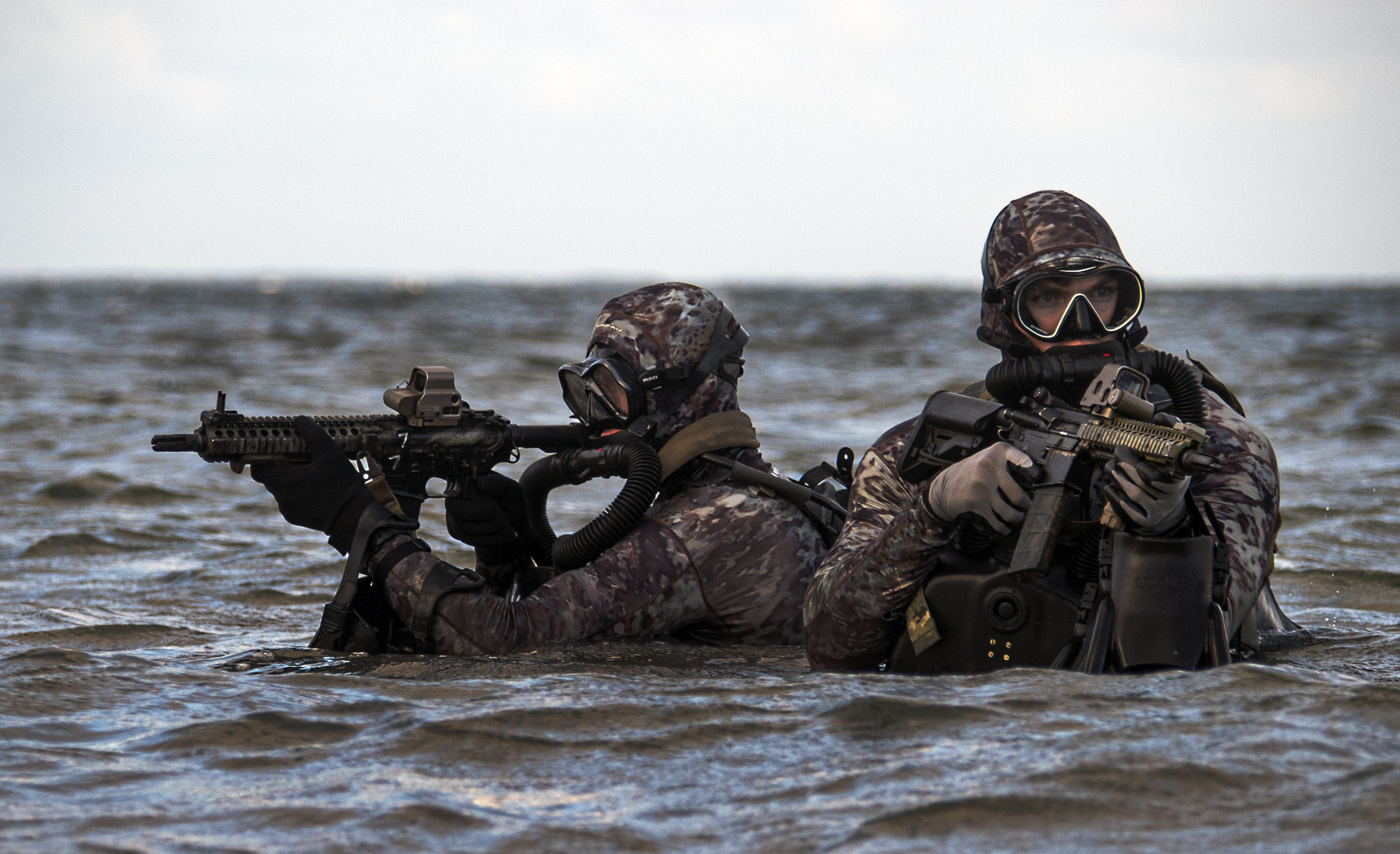
SEALs from Naval Special Warfare Group 2 training in 2019

As of 2022, Naval Special Warfare included more than 10,000 people, including about 9,000 SEALs, SWCCs, and other military personnel and about 1,200 civilian support staff.

Naval Special Warfare Command's components include:

- Naval Special Warfare Group 1: SEAL Teams 1, 3, 5, 7, Tactical Communications Command 1, Logistics Support Unit 1
- Naval Special Warfare Group 2: SEAL Teams 2, 4, 8, 10, Tactical Communications Command 2, Logistics Support Unit 2
- Naval Special Warfare Group 4: Special Boat Teams 12, 20, 22
- Naval Special Warfare Group 8: SEAL Delivery Vehicle Team 1 and Team 2, Logistics Support 3, Special Reconnaissance 1, Special Reconnaissance 2, Training Detachment 3, Mission Support Center
  - Mission Support Center mission is to "organize, train, educate, equip, deploy and sustain specialized intelligence, surveillance, reconnaissance and preparation-of-the-environment capabilities")
- Naval Special Warfare Group 11: SEAL Teams 17, 18 (formerly Operational Support Teams 1, 2) (Navy Reserve composed of SEALs and SWCCs)
- Naval Special Warfare Center: includes the Naval Small Craft Instruction and Technical Training School
- Naval Special Warfare Development Group (formerly SEAL Team 6): Assigned operationally to JSOC

Inactivated Groups:

- Naval Special Warfare Group 3: SEAL Delivery Vehicle Teams 1, 2
  - Deactivated in August 2021; its subordinate units were transferred to Naval Special Warfare Group 8
- Naval Special Warfare Group 10: NSW Support Activity One, NSW Support Activity Two, Mission Support Center
  - Established at Virginia Beach, Va. on 25 May 2011. Deactivated in August 2021; its subordinate units were transferred to Naval Special Warfare Group 8.

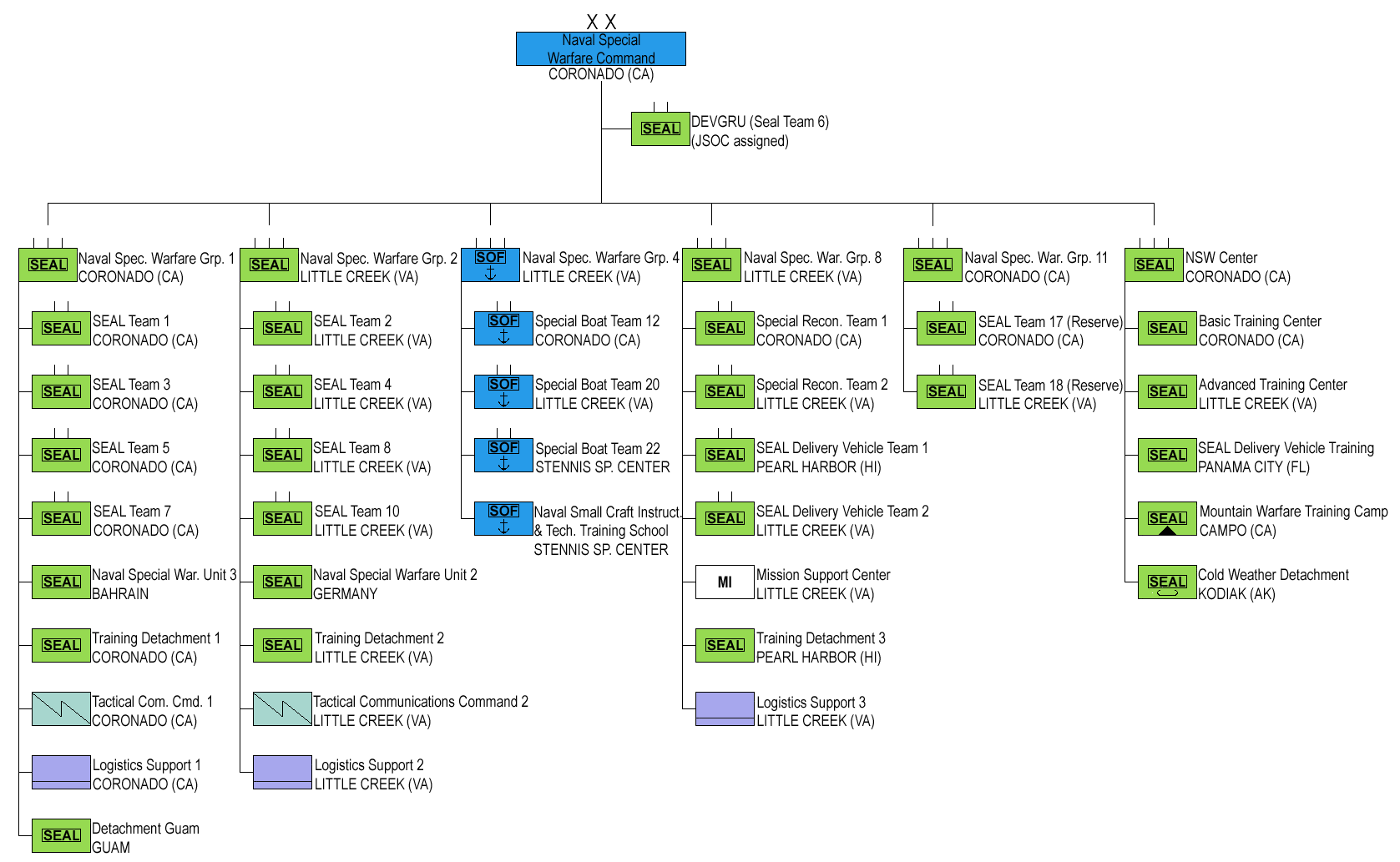
Naval Special Warfare Command structure as of 2022 (following deactivation of Group 3 and 10 and activation of Group 8 in 2021)

== Global War on Terror ==
NSW is committed to combating the global terrorist threats. In addition to being experts in special reconnaissance and direct action missions, the skill sets needed to combat terrorism; NSW is postured to fight a dispersed enemy on their territory. NSW forces can operate from forward-deployed Navy ships, submarines and aviation mobility platforms as well as overseas bases and its own overseas units.

=== War in Afghanistan ===
In response to the attacks on America 11 September 2001, Naval Special Warfare forces put operators on the ground in Afghanistan in October. The first military flag officer to set foot in Afghanistan was a Navy SEAL, Rear Admiral Albert Calland, in charge of Special Operations Command Central (SOCCENT), which was responsible for all special operations for Central Command. Additionally, a Navy SEAL captain commanded Combined Joint Special Operations Task Force (CJSOTF) South. Commonly referred to as Task Force K-Bar, the task force included Navy, Army, Air Force and Coalition Special Operations forces. During Operation Enduring Freedom, NSW forces carried out more than 75 special reconnaissance and direct action missions, destroying more than 500,000 pounds of explosives and weapons; positively identifying enemy personnel and conducting Leadership Interdiction Operations in the search for terrorists trying to escape by seagoing vessels.

Operation Red Wings, a counter insurgent mission in Kunar Province, Afghanistan, involved four Navy SEALs and took place on 28 June 2005. The SEALs were on a mission to try to find a key Taliban leader. However, goat herders stumbled upon their hiding place and alerted local Taliban fighters, and they were subsequently surrounded by Taliban forces. The four SEALs requested back up after the Taliban had surrounded them. In the attempt to rescue the four SEALs on the ground a Boeing CH-47 Chinook containing members of SEAL delivery team one and several Army "Nightstalker" pilots was shot down. At the time, this was the biggest single loss of life for Naval Special Warfare forces since World War II. A firefight ensued, killing three SEALs. The fourth, Marcus Luttrell, was protected by local villagers and later rescued by the U.S. military. The team leader, SEAL Lieutenant Michael P. Murphy, was posthumously awarded the Medal of Honor.

SEAL Senior Chief Petty Officer Dan Healy was awarded the Bronze Star with Combat "V" for Valor, Purple Heart, and Afghanistan Campaign Medal, posthumously.

On the night of 1–2 May 2011, operators from Red Squadron of U.S. Naval Special Warfare Development Group (DEVGRU) (aka "SEAL Team 6") raided the compound of Osama bin-Laden in Abbottabad, Pakistan, killing the al-Qaeda leader and four others. The operation was codenamed "Neptune Spear" in reference to the SEAL insignia's trident.

=== Iraq War ===
Naval Special Warfare has played a significant role in Operation Iraqi Freedom, employing the largest number of SEALs and SWCCs in its history. NSW forces were instrumental in numerous special reconnaissance and direct action missions including the securing of the southern oil infrastructures of the Al Faw peninsula and the off-shore gas and oil terminals; the clearing of the Khawr Abd Allah and Khawr az-Zubayr waterways that enabled humanitarian aid to be delivered to the vital port city of Umm Qasr; reconnaissance of the Shatt al-Arab waterway; capture of high-value targets, raids on suspected chemical, biological and radiological sites; and the first POW rescue since WWII. Additionally, NSW is also fighting the war on terrorism in other global hot spots including the Philippines and the Horn of Africa.

SEAL Petty Officer Second Class Michael A. Monsoor was posthumously awarded the Medal of Honor for actions in Ramadi, Iraq.

== See also ==
- List of Navy SEALs
- Naval Small Craft Instruction and Technical Training School (NAVSCIATTS)
- Special Missions Training Center (SMTC)
- Underwater Construction Teams (UCT)
- Republic of Korea Navy Special Warfare Flotilla – South Korean equivalent
- Information Warfare Command - Japanese equivalent
- Naval Special Operations Command (SEAL/Special Boat/EOD teams) – Philippines equivalent
