= International Military Education and Training =

US student exchange program

International Military Education and Training (IMET) is the title of a United States security assistance program, a type of student exchange program.

== History ==
Congress established the IMET program in the International Security Assistance and Arms Export Control Act of 1976 (Pub. L. No. 94-329, June 30, 1976), which amended the Foreign Assistance Act of 1961 (Pub. L. No. 87-195, Sept. 4, 1961). The policies underlying this program are directed by the United States Department of State's Bureau of Political-Military Affairs and the constituent projects are administered by the United States Department of Defense.

In 1990, the United States Congress expanded IMET to include the training of international civilian personnel and courses on responsible defense resource management, respect for democracy and civilian rule of law, civilian control of the military, military judicial systems and military codes of conduct and also added human rights vetting.

In December 2019, the Department of Defense had 5,181 foreign students from 153 countries for security training.

== Mission ==
The mission of the IMET is to enhance regional stability through mutually beneficial military-to-military relations.

Projects under the program include, but are not limited to, invitations for officers from foreign countries to attend various military schools in the United States, such as the U.S. Army War College or the National Defense University, as well as providing funding for trainers to travel to foreign countries to provide specific, localized training. Topics of instruction are varied and range from English language classes to familiarization training with human rights concepts and the law of war. A complete list of topics varies by year, and may encompass several hundred distinct courses.

The program has supports instruction in Spanish to U.S. and Latin American students at the Western Hemisphere Institute for Security Cooperation (previously called U.S. Army School of the Americas), the Inter-American Air Forces Academy and the Naval Small Craft Instruction and Technical Training School.

== Operations ==
=== Afghanistan ===
According to the Stockholm International Peace Research Institute (SIPRI), the United States spent approximately $26 million for IMET for Afghan National Security Forces between 2002 and 2020.

=== Egypt ===
In 2016, Egypt was allocated $1.8 million for IMET.

=== Pakistan ===
Pakistan Army officers have been trained through the IMET program since the early 1960s and since the September 11 attacks after the program was briefly being suspended in the 1990s.

In September 2017, the Trump administration announced that it would suspend Pakistan's participation in the IMET program to pressure it to crack down on Islamist militants in the region. Pakistan's participation was suspended in August 2018. In December 2019, a State Department spokesperson announced that Washington "has approved the resumption of the International Military Education and Training program." However, the training program has not yet been restored due to the COVID-19 pandemic in Pakistan and other reasons.

=== Mali ===
U.S. military officers suspected that the recruitment of Malian Armed Forces officers for IMET was distorted by bribery.

=== Saudi Arabia ===
Saudi Arabia's participation in IMET was restricted in the aftermath of the 2019 Naval Air Station Pensacola shooting where an officer participant from the Royal Saudi Air Force shot and killed three men.

=== Senegal ===
Senegal has been frequently cited as a country that has immensely benefitted from IMET by using military aid and training received to build a skilled domestic workforce. Former Armed Forces of Senegal military engineers have become contractors, medics and military doctors have become private practitioners, Senegalese Air Force pilots and mechanics join Air Senegal and senior officers schooled in national planning and strategy in the United States and France have been involved in local and national governments.

== Criticism ==
The IMET program has been criticized for failing to sufficiently emphasize military professionalism, civilian control of militaries and the importance of democracy and human rights in its admission processes and curriculum. Training in skills like engineering, transportation, policing and communications has also been criticised for being provided to militaries with a history of human-rights abuses and corruption. Critics have also pointed out that training militaries weakens militaries' respect for civilian authority instead of improving civil-military relations. IMET has also been criticised for being insufficiently funded to be an effective program.

== See also ==
- United States Security Assistance Organizations
- United States Army Security Assistance Command
- Defense Security Cooperation Agency
- Foreign Assistance Act
