= Naval Special Warfare Cold Weather Detachment Kodiak =

United States Navy base near Kodiak, Alaska used to train Navy SEALs

Coordinates: 57.8203°N 152.3319°W

- Kodiak, Alaska
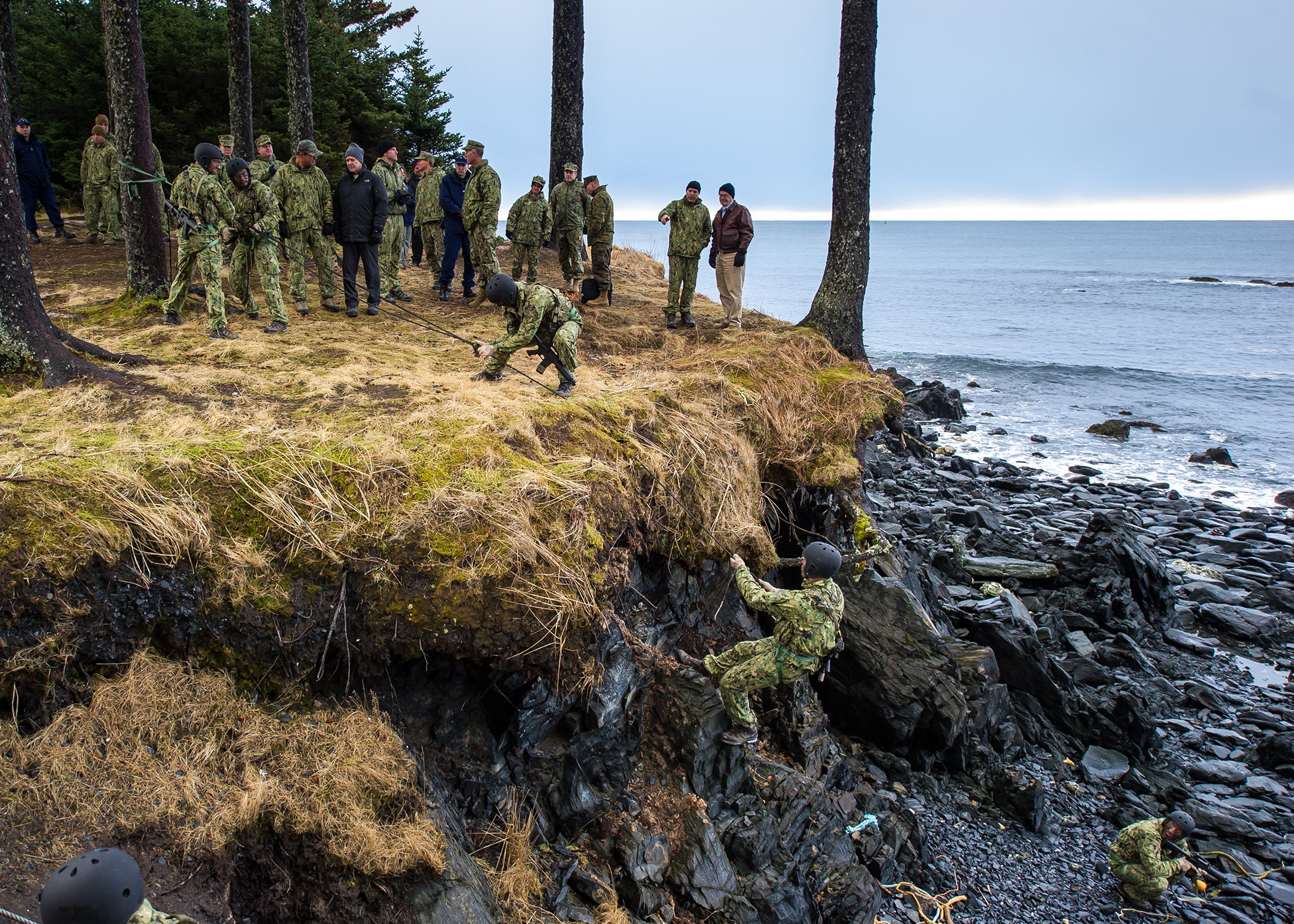

Site information
- Type: Military base
- Controlled by: United States Navy

Site history
- In use: 1987–present

Garrison information
- Garrison: Naval Special Warfare Center

The Special Operations Forces Cold Weather Maritime Training Facility, Naval Special Warfare Cold Weather Detachment Kodiak is a United States Navy base near Kodiak, Alaska, used to train United States Navy SEALs. The training includes cold weather survival and advanced tactical training in forested, coastal environments. The base covers 55 acres on Spruce Cape and training is conducted throughout the surrounding area and nearby Long Island.

As of November 2008, six SEAL classes averaging 40 students come to Kodiak each year for a 28-day course. The trainees are sent to Kodiak after completing Basic Underwater Demolition/SEAL (BUD/S) selection and before they are assigned to their respective SEAL teams.
