= National Navy UDT-SEAL Museum =

Museum of US Navy special forces units

National Navy SEAL Museum

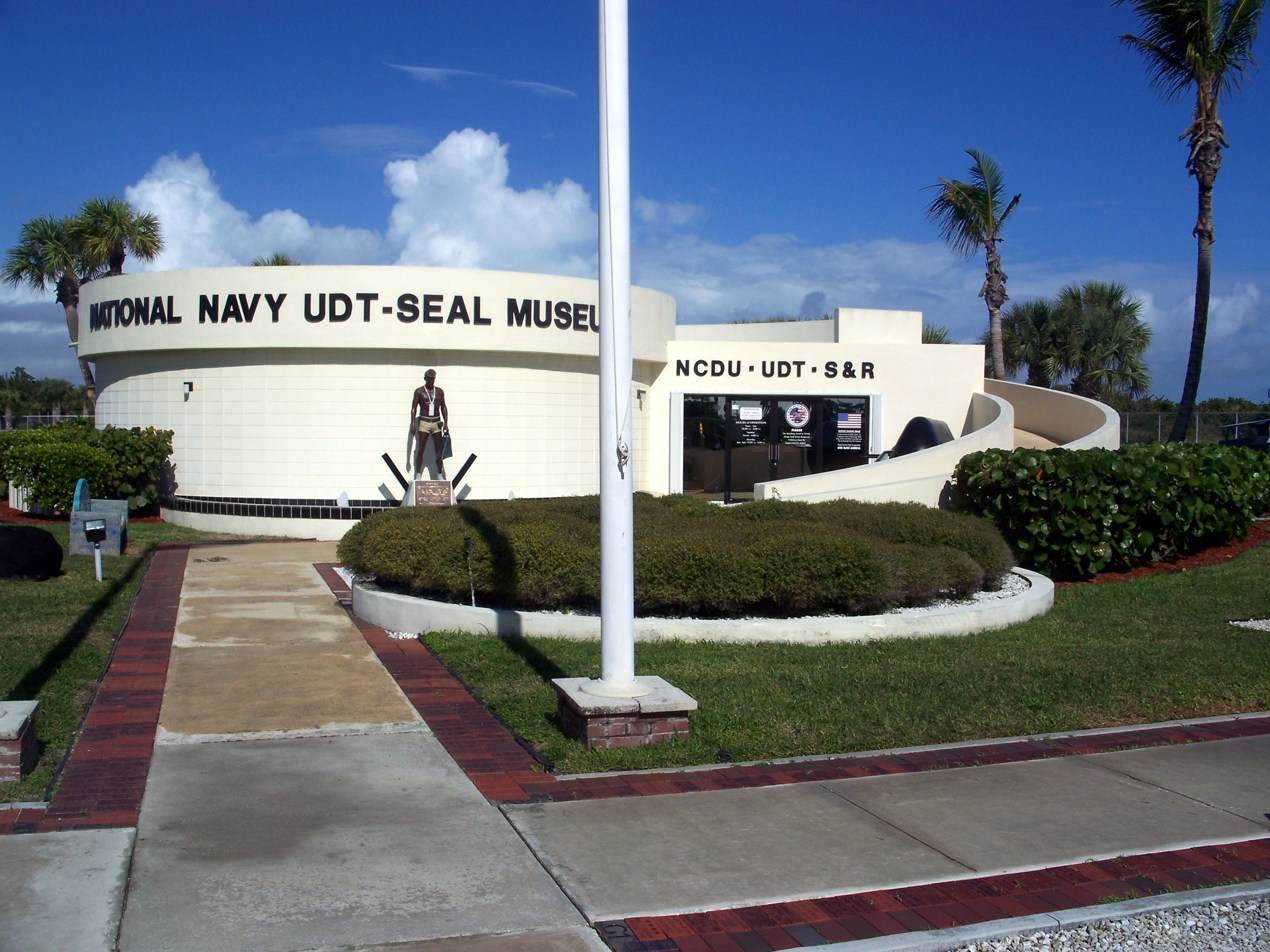

- Location within Florida
- Established: November 11, 1985
- Location: 3300 N Hwy A1A, Fort Pierce, FL 34949
- Coordinates: 27.495249°N 80.300307°W
- Type: Military museum
- Founder: Norman Olson
- Executive director: Grant Mann
- President: Rick Woolard
- CEO: Rick Kaiser
- Curator: Ruth McSween
- Employees: 10
- Website: navysealmuseum.com

The National Navy UDT-SEAL Museum, also known as the Navy SEAL Museum, is located in St. Lucie County, just outside Fort Pierce, Florida. It houses exhibits to inform and educate on the role of Navy Underwater Demolition Teams (UDT) and Sea, Air, Land (SEAL) teams. The museum also preserves the history of the SEALs (the original Navy frogmen first trained outside of Fort Pierce).

The idea of the museum originated in the home of Albert Stankie, where he and other former UDT Frogmen gathered personal artifacts and experiences from their service in World War II. They worked to procure the defunct Ft. Pierce Treasure Museum building and site. The Navy SEAL Museum sits on public land owned by the State of Florida. This evolved into a dedicated facility, which opened in 1985, and was recognized as a National Museum by an act of Congress signed into law February 7, 2008.

== UDT-SEAL memorial ==
UDT-SEAL memorial

The museum's focal point is a UDT-SEAL Memorial, dedicated to Navy SEALs and their predecessors. The memorial consists of a 500-pound, 9-foot-tall, bronze sculpture of a modern Navy SEAL. The names of all Underwater Demolition Team members—the "Frogmen" of World War II and modern Navy SEALs—who have died in the service of the country are carved into black granite panels on the walls surrounding the sculpture and its reflecting pool.

== Other notable exhibits ==
The museum collection includes several artifacts dating from the SEALs' founding, from the days of Scouts & Raiders, through the Underwater Demolition Teams, to recent present-day Navy SEAL activities:

- Original World War II–era obstacles used for demolition training before the Normandy landings ("D-Day").
- LCPL "the Shark Tooth Boat" the UDT used during the Pacific Ocean theater of World War II and Korean War.
- Patrol Boat River (PBR), used by UDTs and SEALs during the Vietnam era. These boats had a shallow draft and jet drive making them ideal for insertion and extraction in the rivers and canals of the region.
- Apollo program spacecraft—the actual training devices used by the UDT "frogmen" recovery teams during the Apollo, Gemini, and Mercury space missions.
- Mark V Special Operations Craft (SOC), an 82-foot and 52-plus ton boat operated by Special Boat Teams, used as a medium-range insertion and extraction platform for Navy SEALs. It saw service for coastal patrol and reconnaissance.
- SEAL Delivery Vehicles or SDVs, specifically the MK XII MOD 0, the MARK IX (9), and the MARK VII (7) MOD 0, which are mini-subs that flood inside (the operators wear compressed air tanks). These SDVs are used to enter enemy harbors clandestinely.
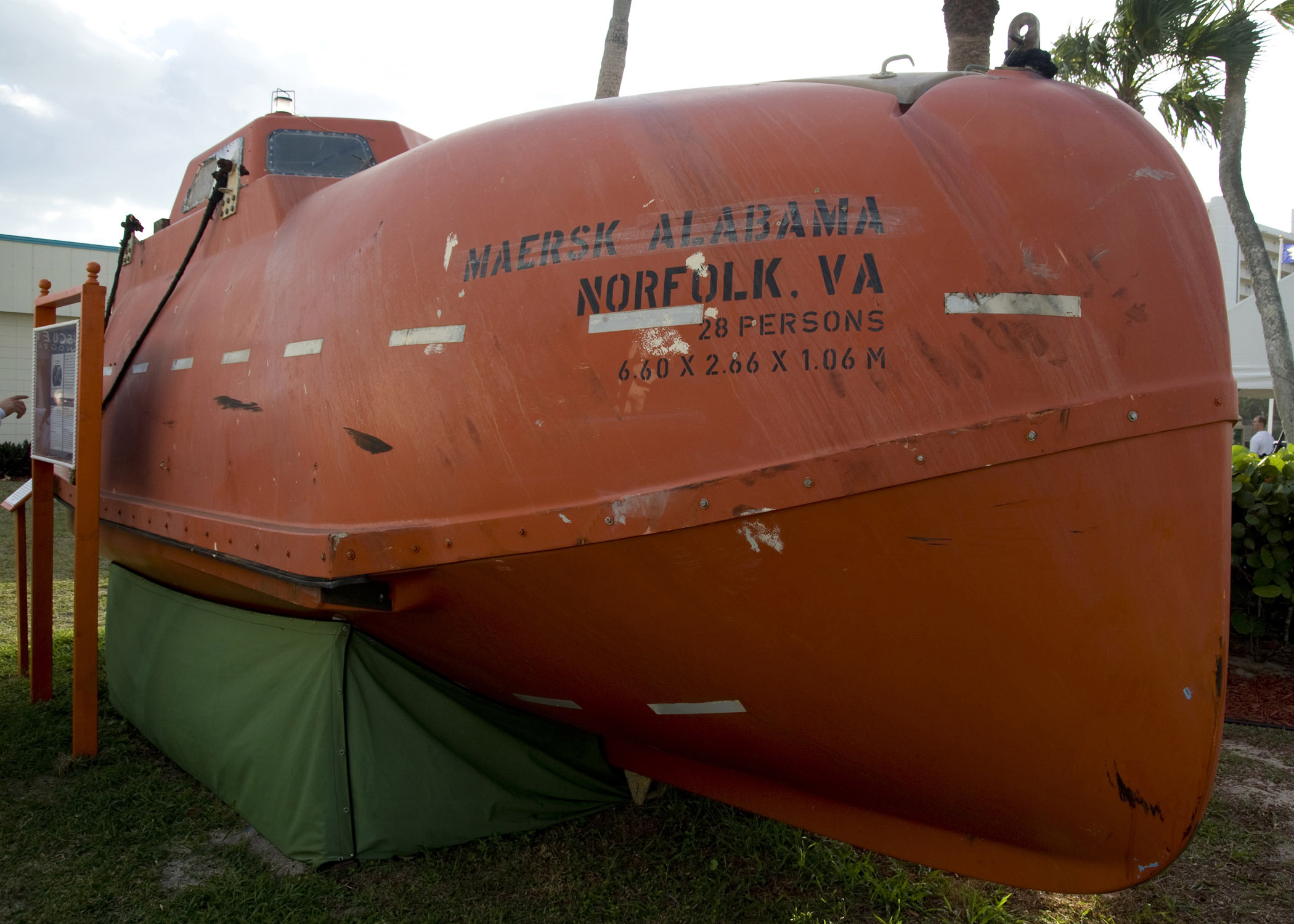
  MV Maersk Alabama lifeboat exhibit
- Various SEAL vehicles from operations in Kuwait, Afghanistan, and Iraq.
- The MV Maersk Alabama lifeboat aboard which Somali pirates held Captain Richard Phillips hostage during the Maersk Alabama hijacking.
- A wall honoring Medal of Honor recipients, with citations for each one.

== Expansion plans ==
In 2024, the museum announced plans to build a two story structure on the current grounds. The St. Lucie County Planning Commission approved the construction plan on April 22, 2025. The $20-million, 30,747-square-foot two-story structure will feature conference rooms, and meeting areas, and provide additional space for exhibits. An accessible rooftop, overlooking the Atlantic Ocean, will be available for events such as private parties and weddings.

== Controversy ==
On August 2, 2020, a video surfaced showing a live service dog demonstration in front of a crowd of civilians and uniformed military personnel at the museum in 2019. The demonstration included four dogs attacking a museum staff member wearing the jersey of former NFL quarterback Colin Kaepernick over his protective equipment. In response to the footage, the Commander of US Navy Special Warfare Command Rear Admiral Collin Green suspended the SEALs' support for the museum.

== See also ==
- List of maritime museums in the United States
