= PSA Panama International Terminal =

Former United States military installation, now Panama Canal Port

Coordinates: 8.956°N 79.580°W

PSA Panama International Terminal is a port built by PSA International on the site of the former United States Navy Rodman Naval Base located southwest of Panama City at the entrance to the Panama Canal from the Pacific Ocean.

== US Naval Station 1937-1999 ==
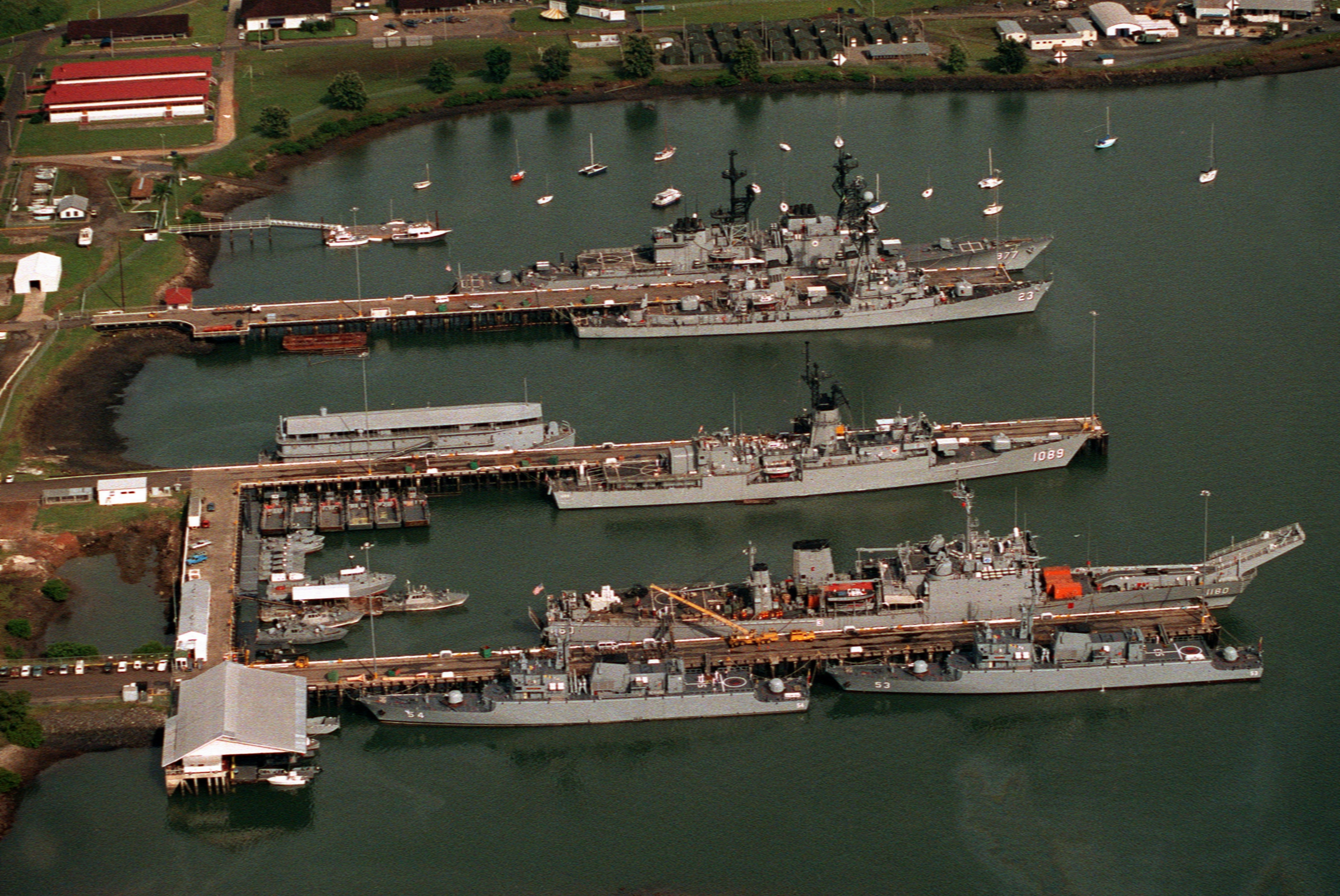
Rodman Naval Station in 1989 with USS Briscoe (DD-977), USS Richard E. Byrd (DDG-23), Jesse L. Brown , Manitowoc, and the Colombian ARC USS Independiente (54) and ARC Antioquia (FM-53)

Rodman Naval Station construction of the United States Navy station began in 1932 and completed in 1937 in the Panama Canal Zone. The station was named for Admiral Hugh Rodman who served as Marine Superintendent and Superintendent of Transportation of the Canal Zone in 1914. Naval Station Rodman played an important role during World War II in support of the Pacific War and during the Cold War.

Built in 1943, the 600 acres (240 ha) U.S. Naval Station Panama Canal (Rodman Naval Station) provided fuel, provisions and other support to military ships passing through the Panama Canal. Until its March 11, 1999 handover to Panama, Rodman was staffed by over 200 military and civilian personnel. The naval station included a port facility with three docks, 87 housing units, warehouses, industrial areas, an office building, and other facilities. Rodman hosted the location of Commander-in-Chief Atlantic Fleet Detachment South (CINCLANTFLT Detachment South), for some time the naval component of the United States Southern Command (SOUTHCOM). CINCLANTFLT took the lead in SOUTHCOM naval exercises, such as UNITAS. With the closure of Rodman Naval Station, naval activities in the hemisphere are now coordinated from United States Fourth Fleet headquarters at Naval Station Mayport in Florida. Rodman also hosted the Naval Small Craft Instruction and Technical Training School (NAVSCIATTS), which offered Spanish-language training to Naval and Coast Guard personnel from throughout the region.

== Closure ==
The base's role waned after the 1960s but was retained until 1999 as the US transferred control of the Canal Zone to Panama. It was renamed as the Vasco Nuñez de Balboa Naval Base.

== Redevelopment ==
In March 2007, PSA announced plans to build a port in Panama; its first in the Americas, which would be sited at the Pacific entrance to the Panama Canal. The port concession was approved by the National Assembly of Panama in April 2008.

The port opened in December 2010; the first ship to use the port was Beluga Festival.

== See also ==
- PSA International
- Naval Base Panama Canal Zone
