= Naval Special Warfare Center =

Component command of the U.S. Naval Special Warfare Command

Coordinates: 32.672340°N 117.167034°W

Phil Bucklew Naval Special Warfare Center
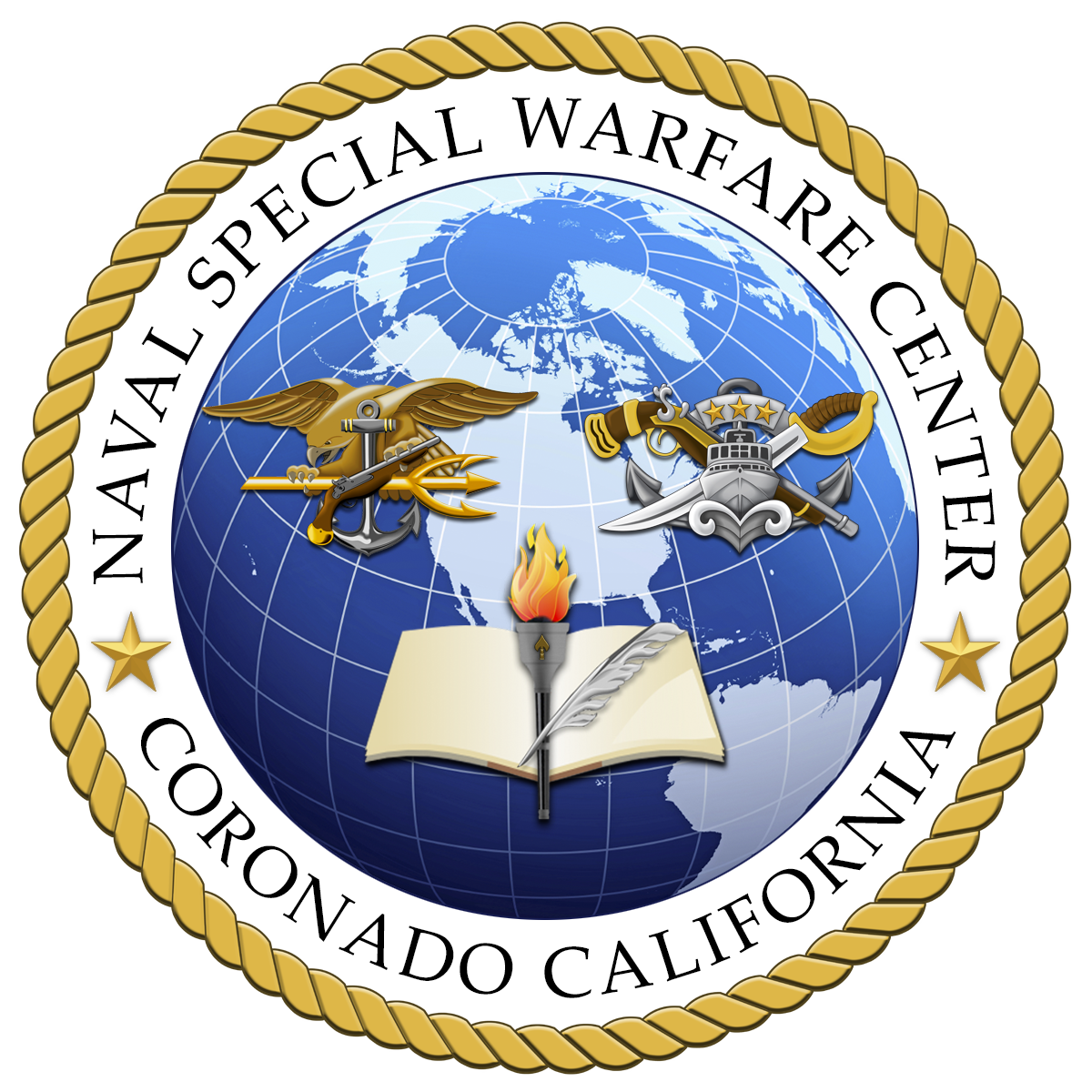
- Active: Yes
- Country: United States of America
- Branch: United States Navy
- Role: To ensure component maritime special operations forces ready to meet the operational requirements of combatant commanders
- Part of: United States Naval Special Warfare Command
- Garrison/HQ: Naval Amphibious Base Coronado

The Phil Bucklew Naval Special Warfare Center (NSWC, also known as "The Center") is a component command of the United States Naval Special Warfare Command, United States Navy. It is sited within Naval Amphibious Base Coronado, California.

The NSWC runs much of the Naval Special Warfare (NSW) training. The main courses are the famous 12-month-long SEAL training (BUD/S and SQT) and 9-month long SWCC training.

== Training sites and detachments ==
The NSWC currently covers these subsidiary training sites:

- Detachment at Naval Air Station Key West, Florida;
- Detachment at Joint Base Pearl Harbor–Hickam, Hawaii;
- Detachment at Yuma Proving Ground, Arizona;
- Detachment at Hurlburt Field, Florida
- Naval Special Warfare Cold Weather Detachment Kodiak, Alaska
- SEAL Delivery Vehicle (SDV) Training at Naval Support Activity Panama City, Florida
- Naval Small Craft Instruction and Technical Training School at Stennis Space Center, Mississippi
- Mountain Warfare Training Camp Michael Monsoor.

== Naval Special Warfare Advanced Training Command ==
- Advanced Training at Naval Amphibious Base Little Creek, Virginia

The Naval Special Warfare Advanced Training Command (NAVSPECWARADVTRACOM) was established 6 December 2006 as a shore activity. It is located at 1 Hooper Boulevard, Imperial Beach, CA 91932-1050 (at the same location as the former NSGD Imperial Beach).

It was advertised as another major milestone in the NSW Global Transformation and a reshaping of the Naval Special Warfare Center. The requirement for NSW specialized Courses of Instruction (COI) in support of Overseas Contingency Operations will continue, which was thought to necessitate establishment of the advanced training command. NAVSPECWARADVTRACOM will be responsible for the coordination, management, and conduct of the specialized COIs and for providing the same training to Joint Special Operations and foreign counterpart personnel. Manpower exceeding 200 will be provided by transfers from Naval Special Warfare Center, San Diego. The command supports more than 30 advanced training courses, seven detachments and 15 training sites across the country, including detachments in Alaska and Hawaii.
