= Special Warfare Combat Crewmen =

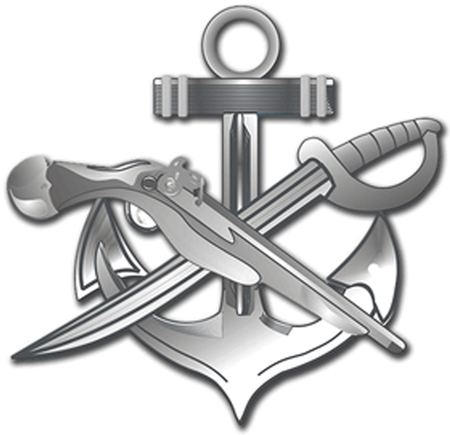
- Rating insignia (SB)
- Founded: 16 April 1987; 39 years ago
- Country: United States
- Branch: United States Navy
- Type: Special operations forces
- Role: Special reconnaissance; Foreign internal defense; Direct action; Unconventional warfare; Maritime support for other special operations forces; VBSS; Maritime infiltration and exfiltration
- Size: ≈755 (active) ≈50 (reserve)
- Part of: U.S. Special Operations Command; U.S. Naval Special Warfare Command
- Nicknames: "The Boat Teams", "Boat Guys," and "Dirty Boat Guys" (DBGs)
- Mottos: "On Time, On Target, Never Quit!"
- Engagements: Multinational Force in Lebanon; Operation Prime Chance; Operation Earnest Will; Operation Praying Mantis; Operation Snowcap; Operation Just Cause; Persian Gulf War; Global War on Terrorism; Operation Enduring Freedom; War in Afghanistan; Operation Ocean Shield; 2013 raid on Barawe; Operation Enduring Freedom – Philippines; Operation Iraqi Freedom; Battle of Umm Qasr; Battle of Al Faw; War on ISIL; Siege of Marawi; Operation Inherent Resolve

The Special Warfare Combat Crewmen (SWCC /ˈsjuːɪk/) are United States Naval Special Warfare Command personnel who operate and maintain small craft for special operations missions, particularly those of U.S. Navy SEALs. Their rating is Special Warfare Boat Operator (SB).

Prospective SWCC sailors go through a special training program at Naval Amphibious Base Coronado, where they learn boating and weapons tactics, techniques, and procedures that focus on clandestine infiltration and exfiltration of SEALs and other special operations forces. SWCCs employ their specialized training, equipment, and tactics conducting missions worldwide, both independently and in support of US and foreign special operations forces (SOF).

== History ==
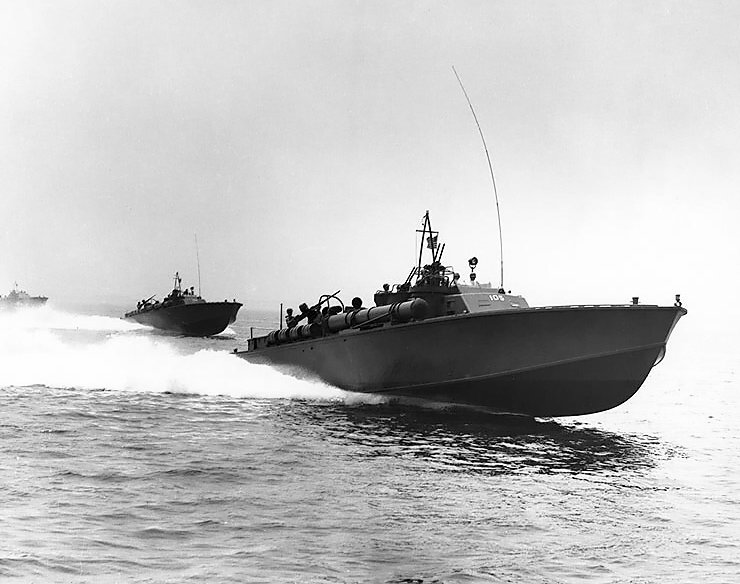
PT-105 underway with sister boat PT-109

=== Origins ===
Special boat teams trace their history to the PT boats of World War II. Motor Torpedo Boat Squadron Three rescued General Douglas MacArthur (and later the Filipino president Manuel L. Quezon) from the Philippines after the Japanese invasion and then participated in guerrilla actions until American resistance ended with the fall of Corregidor. PT boats subsequently participated in most of the campaigns in the Southwest Pacific by conducting and supporting joint/combined reconnaissance, blockade, sabotage, and raiding missions as well as attacking Japanese shore facilities, shipping, and forces. PT boats were used in the European theater beginning in April 1944 to help the Office of Strategic Services insert spies and French Resistance personnel and for amphibious landing deception.

=== Birth of NSW-Task Force 116, and the Vietnam War ===
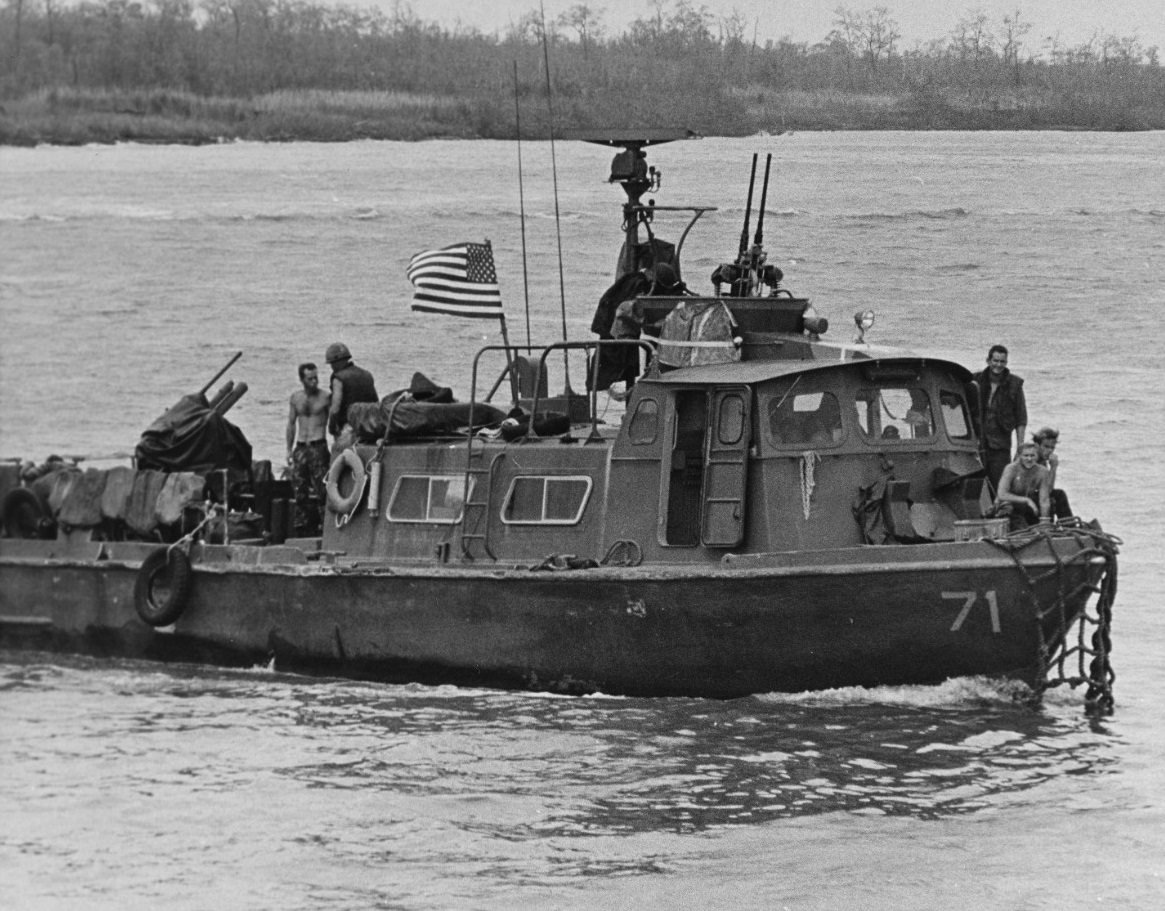
Patrol Craft Fast (PCF-71) from Underwater Demolition Team (Task Force 116) returns to the Sea Float base on the Cua Long River after a patrol.

The modern special boat operator grew out of efforts during the Vietnam War to develop forces for riverine warfare. In February 1964, Boat Support Unit ONE (BSU-1) was established under Naval Operations Support Group, Pacific to operate the newly reinstated fast patrol boat (PTF) program and to operate high-speed craft for NSW forces. Nicknamed (SWIFT) crews BSU-1 would directly support Naval Special Warfare Operations, initially outfitted primarily by Underwater Demolition Team (UDT) and the newly established SEALs. The schooling was in Coronado, California, and every new sailor that wasn't already a UDT or SEAL was trained extensively in boat/weapons operations, and advanced swimming to work alongside UDT or SEALs. The boat crew members underwent a rite of passage similar to "Hell Week" by SEALs. A UDT and SEAL platoon was assigned to each of BSU-1's squadrons of Mobile Support Teams (MST 1–3). The squadrons inserted and extracted from their patrol area by PBRs. In late 1964, the first PTFs arrived in Da Nang, Vietnam. In 1965, Boat Support Unit One began training patrol craft fast (SWIFT) crews for Vietnamese coastal patrol and interdiction operations. As the Vietnam mission expanded into the riverine environment, additional craft, tactics, and training evolved for riverine patrol and direct UDT/SEAL support. Boat Support Unit TWO was initially formed in 1965 to run and maintain high-speed boats for the UDT and SEAL teams at Little Creek, VA.

In 1966, River Patrol Force (Task Force 116) operated river patrol boats on counterinsurgency operations in the Mekong Delta region of Vietnam in Operation Game Warden. The task force utilized small watercraft far up the Mekong River into Laos and supported the Amphibious Ready Groups operating on South Vietnam's river such as Operation Market Time. These boats would insert UDTs or SEALs by patrol craft while they went ashore to demolish obstacles and enemy bunkers.

In July 1968, Light SEAL Support Craft (LSSC) began replacing PBRs as their primary support craft. Mobile Support Teams (MST 1–3) provided combat craft support for UDT/SEAL operations, as did patrol boat, river (PBR) and patrol craft, fast (PCF) sailors.

On 1 July 1971, Boat Support Units ONE and TWO missions broadened to encompass coastal/riverine patrol and interdiction. Both commands were renamed into Coastal River Squadron ONE and TWO. A wide range of small boat projects were developed and tested with the command's help. The Coastal Patrol and Interdiction Craft, the Landing Craft Swimmer Recovery Vessel, the FLAGSTAFF (PGH-1), one of the Navy's first operational hydrofoils, and the Swimmer Delivery Vehicle, which carried on the now-renamed SEAL Delivery Vehicle diving operations, were among them. After UDT-13 was split in 1975, several of its members joined Coastal River Squadrons and others contributed to the creation of the UCT teams.

In 1978, Coastal River Squadron ONE became Special Boat Squadron ONE. Special boat units, which were still composed primarily of UDT/SEAL personnel or specialized boat crew members, spawned four operational special boat units from the original MSTs: SBU-11, SBU-12, SBU-13, and Special Boat Detachments. The following year, in 1979, Coastal River Squadron TWO became Special Boat Squadron TWO. This formed three more operational special boat units: SBU-20, SBU-22, and SBU-24.

In 1983, remaining UDT diver teams underwent their final consolidation with the SEAL teams. The establishment of the United States Naval Special Warfare Command took place in 1987, consolidating the Special Boat Units and SEALs into a single command. Additionally, a new special boat unit, SBU-26, was also established during this time.

Naval Special Warfare Group 4 (NSWG-4) was established in October 2002 as a result of changes to the NSW's restructure. Special Boat Teams 12, 20, and 22 all were established merged from various SBU units. NSWG-4 is tasked with organizing, equipping, and training established SWCC crews to assign combatant craft to the restructured Special Boat Teams to support Naval Special Warfare.

=== War on drugs and Panama ===
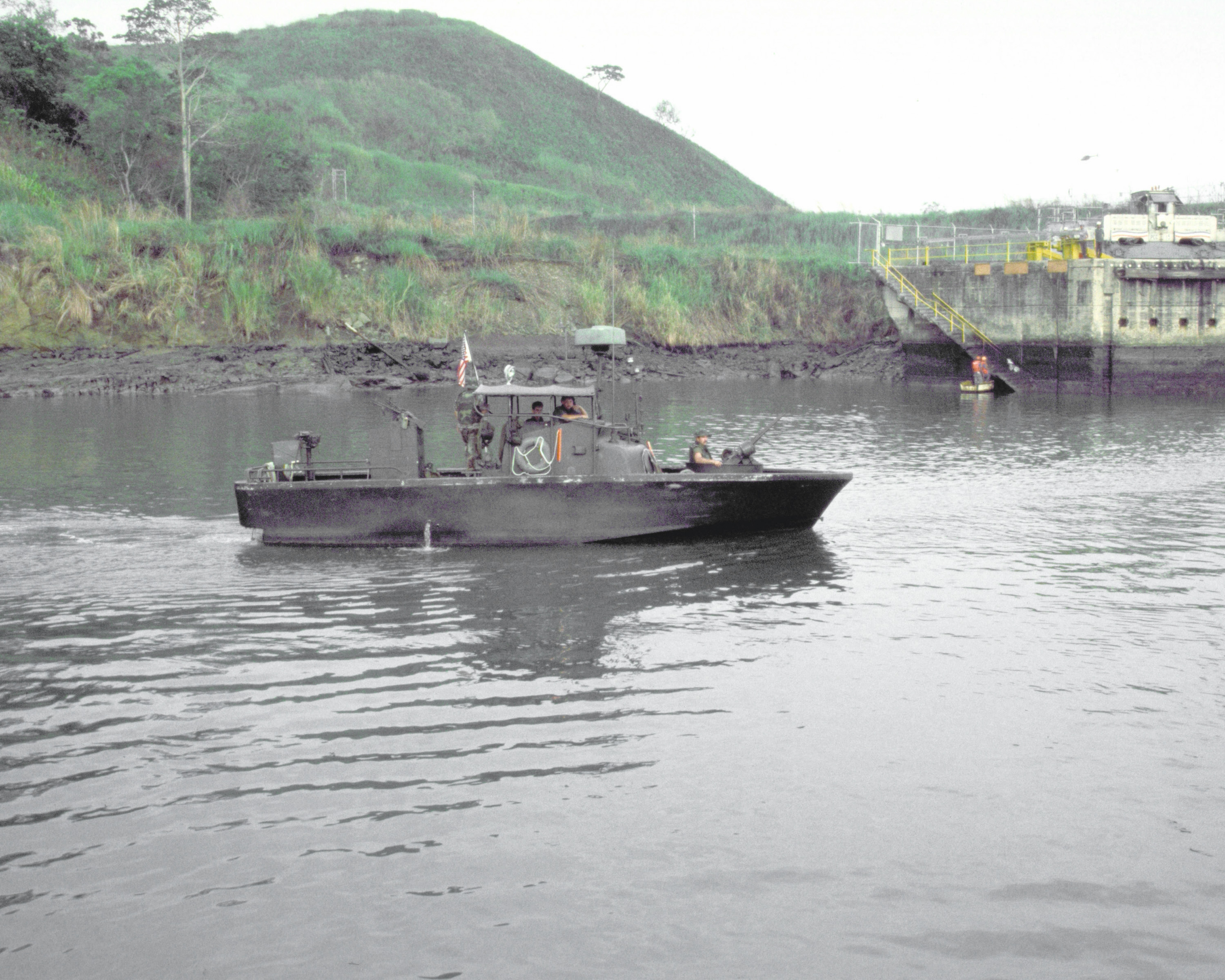
Members of Special Boat Unit 26 (SBU-26) operate in Panama before Operation Just Cause

The United States Navy contributed extensive special operations assets to the war on drugs and Panama's invasion, codenamed Operation Just Cause. This included SEAL Teams 2 and 4, Naval Special Warfare Unit 8, and Special Boat Unit 26, all falling under Naval Special Warfare Group 2; and the separate Naval Special Warfare Development Group (DEVGRU).

=== War on terror ===
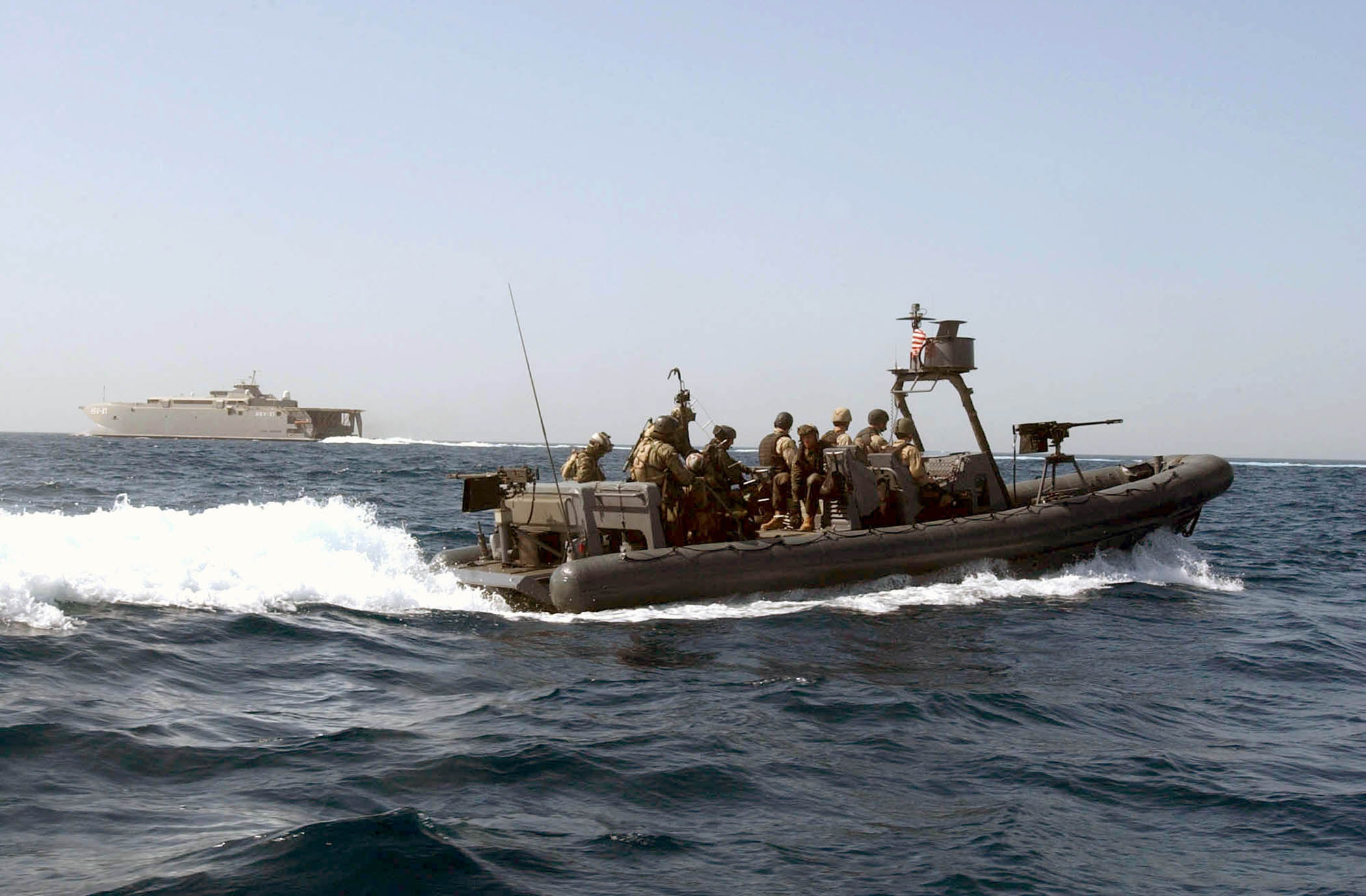
Special Boat Team patrolling in Operation Iraqi Freedom

Following the September 11 attacks, SWCC deployed throughout the war on terror, including the War in Afghanistan and Iraq War. SWCC assisted in the security of numerous oil platforms in the Persian Gulf, as well as conducted Visit, Board, Search, and Seizure (VBSS) and reconnaissance operations. Some Special Warfare boat operators were attached to SEAL Teams or occasionally with Marine special operations as medics and JTACs. Overtime throughout the conflict, some SWCCs were utilized to supplement Navy SEALs on land functioning as their "Engineers" as adept mechanics, gunners, and drivers during convoys or insertion/extraction operations. SWCC were integral in the war on terror, particularly in the Battle of Al Faw (2003), Battle of Umm Qasr, 2013 raid on Barawe and Siege of Marawi.

Facing the growing rise of terror groups in the Philippines, the Navy dispatched special boat teams to train and advise Armed Forces of the Philippines and conduct maritime operations against piracy, trafficking, and port/waterway security. Some 160 U.S. special operators went on patrol with Filipinos in the jungles of Basilan island, an Abu Sayyaf stronghold. In 2002, a MH-47 Chinook helicopter with 10 American operators crashed during a night operation; none survived. In 2007, SWCC operated Mark V Special Operations Craft and conducted various maritime interdiction, visit-board-search-and-seizure, and reconnaissance operations. Some unconventional tactics and equipment were used, such as canoes with outboard motors, small boats, and jetskis for low-profile collection operations.

SWCC detachments have participated in nearly every major conflict since then, notably in the Persian Gulf (operations Prime Chance and Earnest Will 1987–88, Operation Snowcap 1987–1995, the U.S. invasion of Panama in 1989–1990, the 1990-1991 Gulf War and the ongoing global war on terror, and counter-narcotics operations in South and Central America.

== Missions ==
SWCC conduct Naval Special Warfare training techniques

SWCCs operate and maintain state-of-the-art, high-performance vessels to support special operations, particularly clandestine insertion and extraction and in shallow water where large ships cannot operate. In recent years, SWCC have trained for tactical driving and convoy operations.

SWCC also perform search and rescue for combat and humanitarian assistance, help law enforcement agencies, and train foreign units.

== Special warfare boat operator (SB) rating ==
The special warfare boat operator (SB) rating was established on 1 October 2006, under the same order that created the special warfare operator (SO) rating for SEALs.

Navy rating	Abbreviation	Pay grade	Special warfare rating	Abbreviation	Rank insignia
Master chief petty officer	MCPO	E-9	Master chief special boat operator	SBCM	
Senior chief petty officer	SCPO	E-8	Senior chief special boat operator	SBCS	
Chief petty officer	CPO	E-7	Chief special boat operator	SBC	
Petty officer first class	PO1	E-6	Special boat operator, first class	SB1	
Petty officer second class	PO2	E-5	Special boat operator, second class	SB2	
Petty officer third class	PO3	E-4	Special boat operator, third class	SB3	

=== Officers and leadership ===
Special Warfare Combatant Craft Crewmen are enlisted and led by senior NCOs. Senior NCOs can serve as Patrol Officer, Detachment Chief, Boat Captain, Senior Navigator, Senior Communications Operator, or Chief Engineer.

Special Boat Teams are commanded by Navy SEAL officers and SWCC Warrant officers. These Officers lead Special Boat Team (SBT) operators and direct personnel in the execution of combatant craft operations, and may serve as Boat Troop commanders; Detachment officers-in-charge; or a variety of administrative positions.

=== Qualification insignia ===
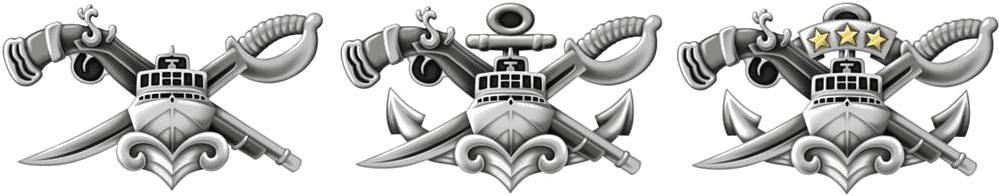
New SWCC qualification insignias (from left to right: Basic, Senior, and Master)

The special warfare combat crewman insignia is a Navy qualification badge. First proposed in 1996, an initial version was approved for wear in 2001.

On 19 August 2016, the original insignia was replaced with three insignias that indicate qualification level: SWCC Basic, SWCC Senior, and SWCC Master. The SWCC Basic Insignia is a 2.5-by-1.25-inch silver matte metal pin depicting a Mark V Special Operations Craft atop a bow wave in front of a naval enlisted cutlass crossed with a cocked flintlock pistol. The SWCC Senior insignia adds an upright anchor in the background. The SWCC Master insignia adds a banner with three gold stars on the upper portion of the anchor.

== Training ==
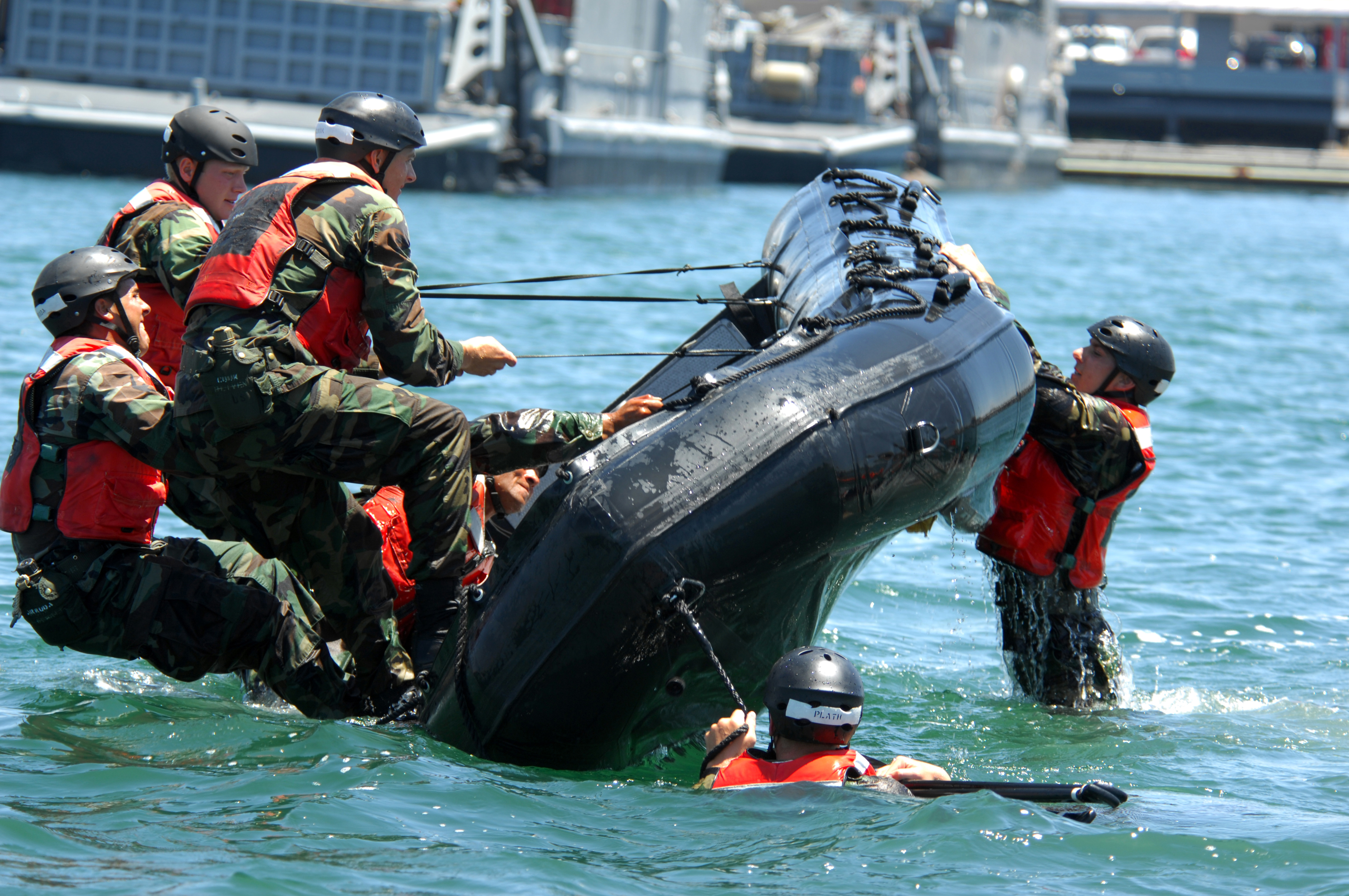
During BCT students perform a "dump boat" exercise with the combat rubber raiding craft (CRRC)

To become a special warfare combat crewman, a service member must apply and be accepted to special programs, complete a special boot camp (called 800 divisions) alongside SEAL (SO) candidates, Explosive Ordnance Disposal (EOD) candidates, Diver Candidates and Aviation Air Rescue candidates.

SWCC candidates then go to Naval Special Warfare Preparatory School (NSWPS, also called BUD/S Prep) in Great Lakes Chicago, then to Coronado, California, to attend Basic Underwater Demolition Orientation/or SEAL Orientation (BO). Upon testing out of BO, SWCC candidates attend Basic Crewman Selection (BCS). SWCC candidates go on to Basic Crewman Training (BCT); following this, SWCC candidates will undergo Crewman Qualification Training (CQT) and then go on to specialized individual schools.

=== Pipeline ===
Applicants must:

- Meet specific eyesight requirements: 20/40 best eye; 20/70 worst eye; correctable to 20/25 with no color blindness
- Meet the minimum Armed Services Vocational Aptitude Battery (ASVAB) score: AR+VE=103, MC=51
- Be 30 years old or younger; min. 17
- Be a U.S. citizen

Initial SWCC training consists of:

- 8-week Naval Special Warfare Prep School-(BUD/S Prep) Great Lakes, Illinois
- 3-week BUD/S Orientation at Naval Amphibious Base Coronado, California
- 7-week Basic Crewman Selection (BCS) at the Naval Special Warfare Center, NAB Coronado.
- 7-week Basic Crewman Training (BCT) at the Naval Special Warfare Center, NAB Coronado.
- 21-week SWCC Crewman Qualification Training (CQT) at Naval Amphibious Base Coronado

=== Screening ===
To proceed to basic crewman training, a trainee must pass this test:

- Swim 500 yards under 13 minutes (Side Stroke / Breast Stroke)
- Rest 10 minutes
- 50 push-ups within 2 minutes
- Rest 2 minutes
- 50 sit-ups within 2 minutes
- Rest 2 minutes
- 6 pull-ups within 2 minutes
- Rest 10 minutes
- 1.5-mile run under 12 minutes
- Pass a basic underwater demolition/SEAL physical fitness screening test in boot camp and in the delayed entry program in order to qualify

But the Navy says it expects successful candidates to perform more like this:

- Swim 500 yards under 10 minutes (Side Stroke / Breast Stroke)
- Rest 10 minutes
- 70 push-ups within 2 minutes
- Rest 2 minutes
- 70 sit-ups within 2 minutes
- Rest 2 minutes
- 10 pull-ups within 2 minutes
- Rest 10 minutes
- 1.5-mile run under 10 minutes
- Pass a basic underwater demolition/SEAL physical fitness screening test in boot camp and in the delayed entry program in order to qualify

=== Naval Special Warfare Preparatory School (BUD/s Prep) ===
The two-month Naval Special Warfare Preparatory School (NSW Prep or BUD/s Prep) takes place at Great Lakes, Illinois. NSW Prep has one goal: Improve a SWCC candidates physical readiness for the grueling trials of Basic Crewman Selection (BCS). Students are introduced to the obstacle course, soft sand runs, knot tying, open water swimming, water rescue, drownproofing, and basic navigational skills. Many candidates will quit during the first three weeks. After they pass Pre-BUD/s, candidates will go to BUD/S Orientation at Naval Amphibious Base Coronado, California. Here they will spend the rest of their training and the next three weeks preparing for their pipeline along with SEAL candidates.

=== Basic Crewman Selection (BCS) ===
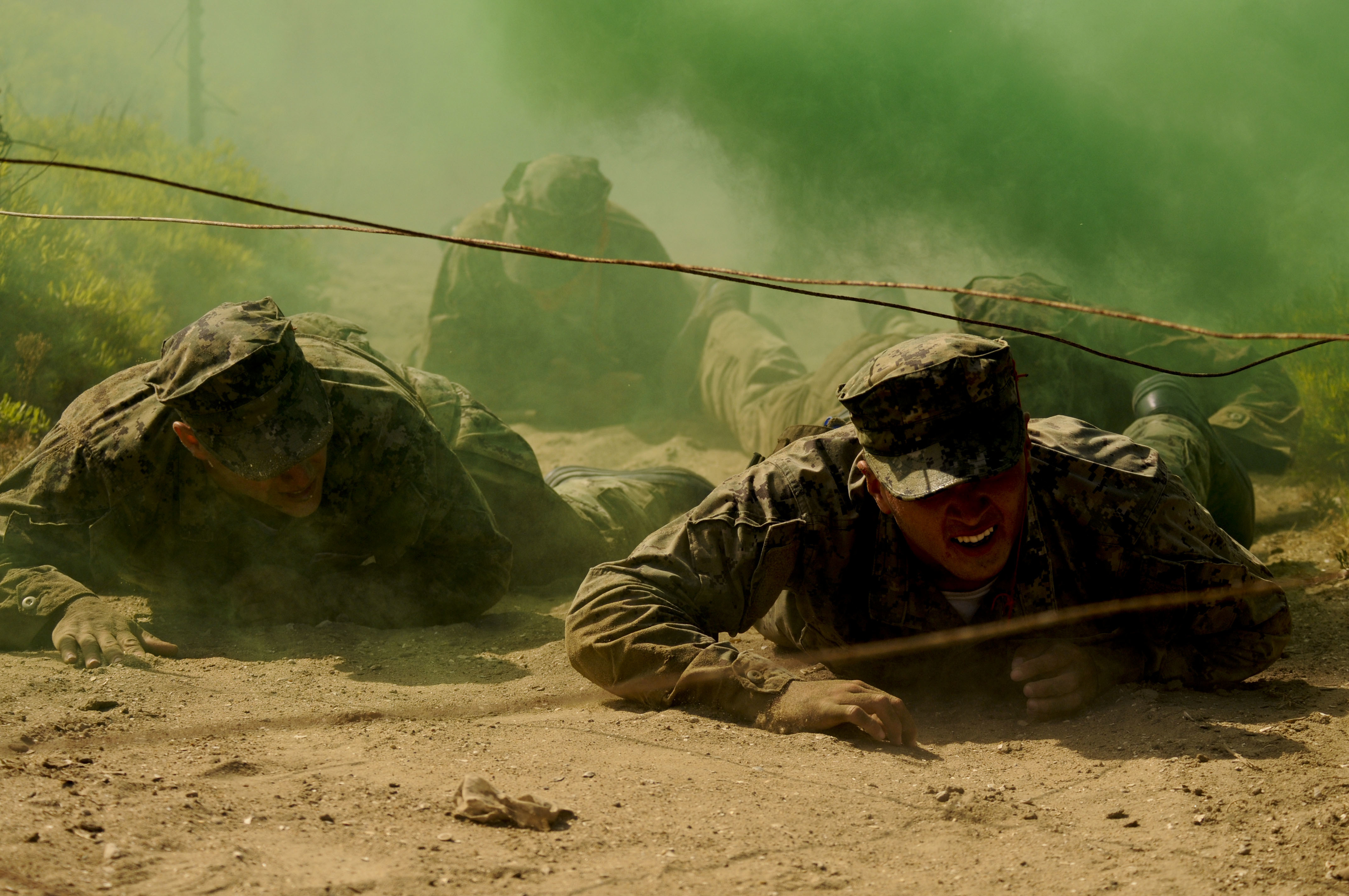
Candidates perform a low crawl during Basic Crewman Selection

Instructors of the SWCC Basic Crewman Selection course train, develop, and assess SWCC candidates in physical conditioning, water competency, teamwork, and mental tenacity. This course starts with a three-week indoctrination. The SWCC basic crewman training last seven weeks. Physical conditioning with running, swimming, and calisthenics grows harder as the weeks progress. Students abilities, mental fortitude and teamwork skills are tested during an arduous 4-day evolution involving little sleep, constant exposure to the elements, underway boat and swimming events, and a test of navigational skills and boat tactics. This test is referred to as the Crucible or "The Tour". SWCC students participate in weekly timed runs, timed obstacle course evolutions, pool, bay and ocean swims, and learn small-boat seamanship. Upon the completion of SWCC Basic Crewman Selection(BCS), students advance to Basic Crewman Training(BCT).

=== Crewman Qualification Training (CQT) ===
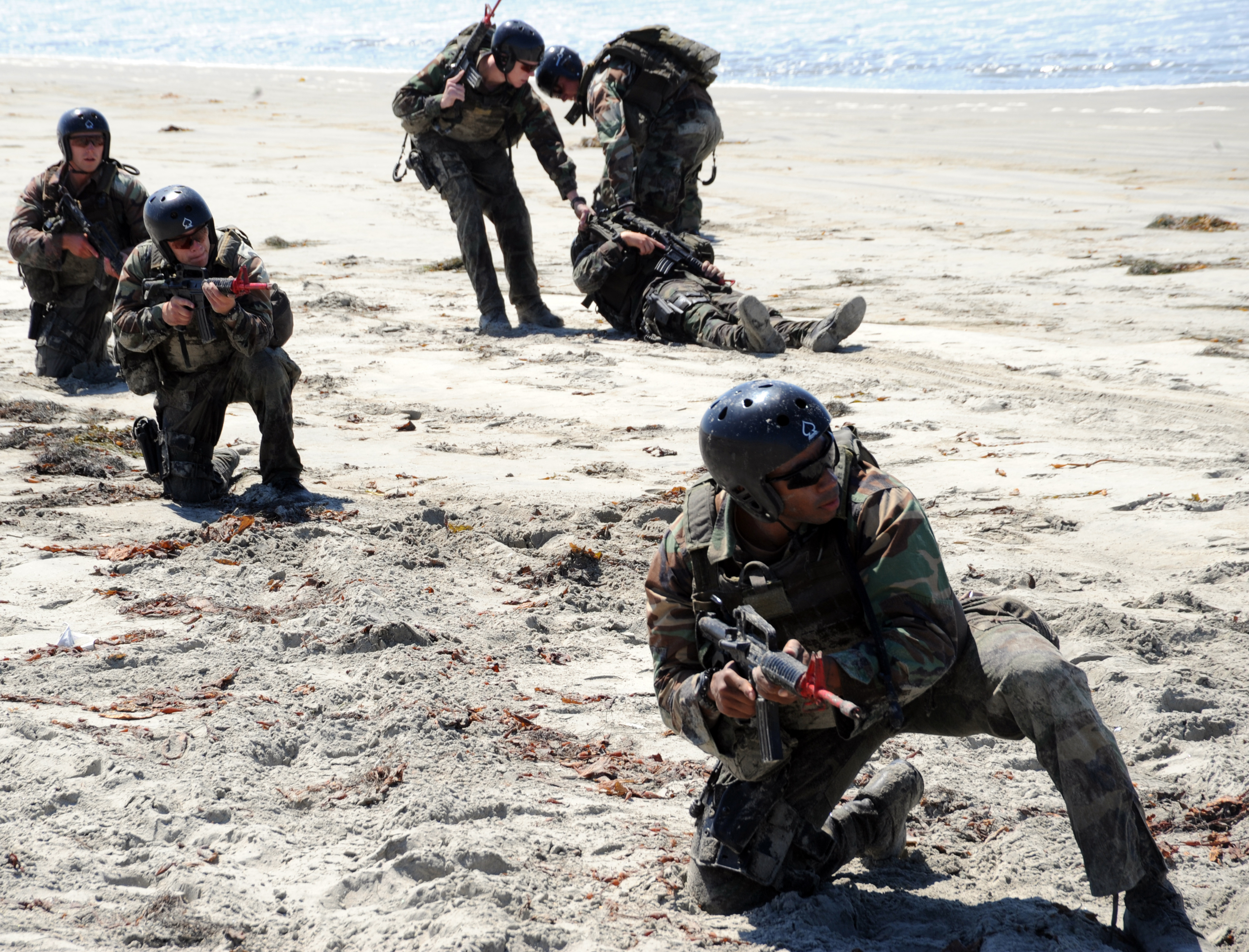
CQT students perform small unit tactics providing cover for their teammates in a medical evacuation training scenario

During the 21-week crewman qualification training, instructors train and evaluate SWCC candidates in basic weapons, seamanship, casualty care, and small unit tactics. In the first phase, Basic, candidates learn first aid, small arms, heavy weapons, basic combat skills, engineering, and towing and trailering procedures for SWCC boats. Candidates must pass tests in every subject to move on.

The final, or Advanced, phase includes communications, Tactical Combat Casualty Control (TCCC), navigation and boat handling, mission planning and execution, live fire while underway on the boats. Students are introduced to the NSW mission planning cycle, enabling them to participate in the planning, briefing, execution, and debriefing of an NSW mission. Physical training is geared to prepare the student to meet the requirements of the operational special boat teams. CQT concentrates on teaching maritime navigation, communications, waterborne patrolling techniques, marksmanship and engineering, as well as small unit tactics and close-quarters combat. After finishing CQT, SWCCs attend SERE Level C school.

Candidates that have made it through the pipeline are awarded their SWCC pins, designating them as a Special Warfare Boat Operator (SB) rating. They are subsequently assigned to a Special Boat Team to begin preparing for their first deployment.

=== Further training ===
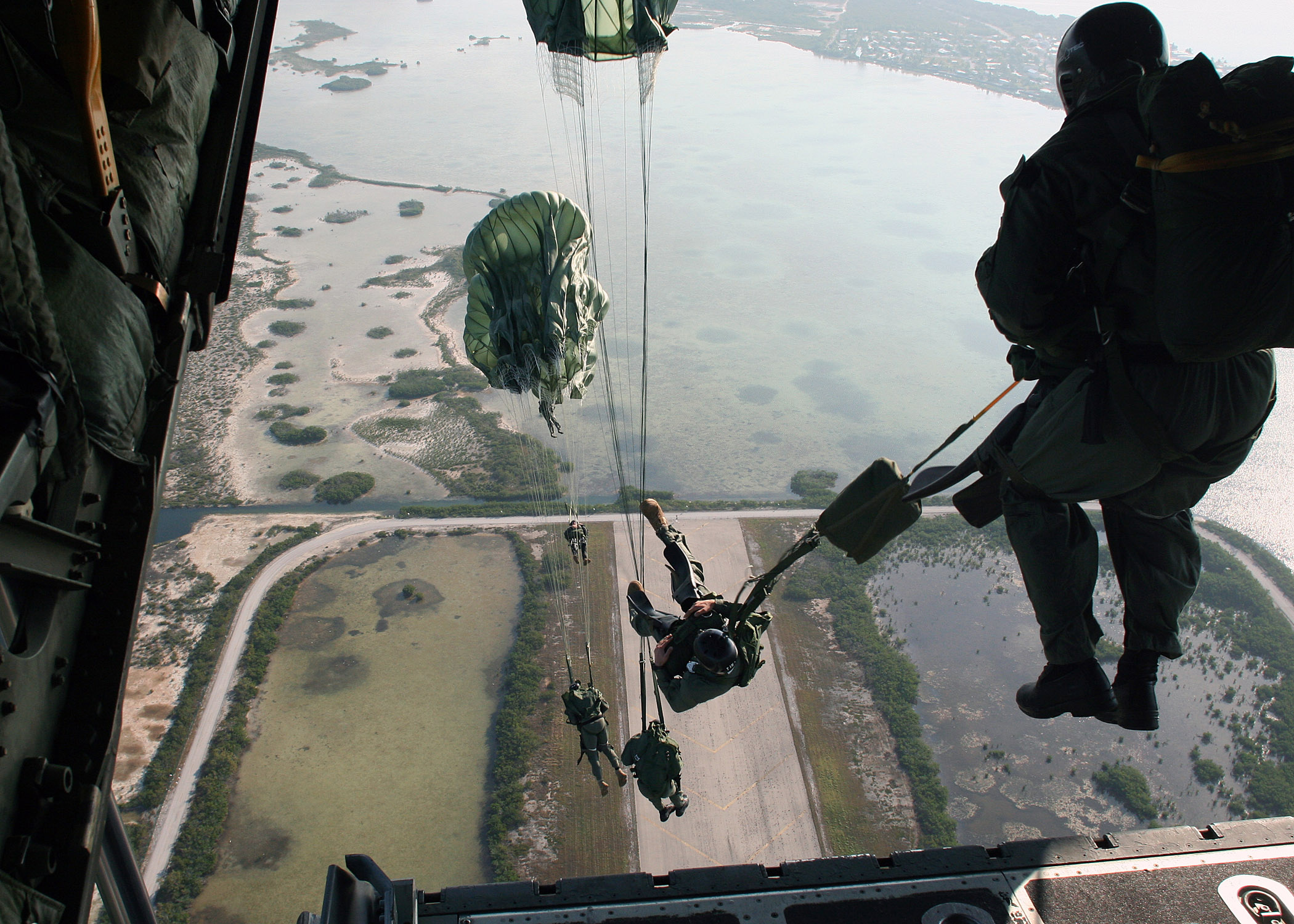
Special Boat Team 20 jump from an Air Force C-130 Hercules aircraft during a static-line parachute jump

SWCCs receive broad individual and detachment in-house training and attend schools as needed to support Naval Special Warfare Command. Before reporting to a Special Boat Team, SWCCs attend a 12-week language course, where they must learn a language assigned to them according to the needs of their respective teams. SWCC attend Naval Small Craft Instruction and Technical Training School to receive tactical boat training.

Every SWCC receives basic medic assistant training for combat lifesaving skills. After reporting to the teams SWCCs may attend schools relative to their respective individual specialities and or mission readiness schools such as desert survival, jungle survival, cold water survival, special operations combat medic training, naval special warfare combat fighting course, fast-rope, air assault, designated marksman school, tactical driving, and many others offered within Naval Special warfare.

=== Advanced equipment ===
SWCC often go to new U.S. Department of Defense schools according to the needs of their respective team and adaptable mission set. SWCCs also receive in-house training with the latest technology, such as advanced radio communications, advanced weapons systems, advanced navigation systems, small unmanned aerial systems (SUAS), outboard, diesel, and waterjet engines.

==== Aerial deployment training ====
U.S. Air Force and U.S. Navy MCADS (1:07)
A U.S. Air Force C-17 crew and Special Boat Team 20 conduct MCADS exercise

SWCCs can drop boats from aircraft using specialized equipment. The Maritime Craft Aerial Deployment System (MCADS) drops an 11-meter RIB (Rigid Inflatable Boat) rigged with four large parachutes from the back of a C-130 or C-17 at about 3,500 feet. About four SWCCs immediately follow the boat out of the plane, land nearby, and have the boat ready to go in about 20 minutes.

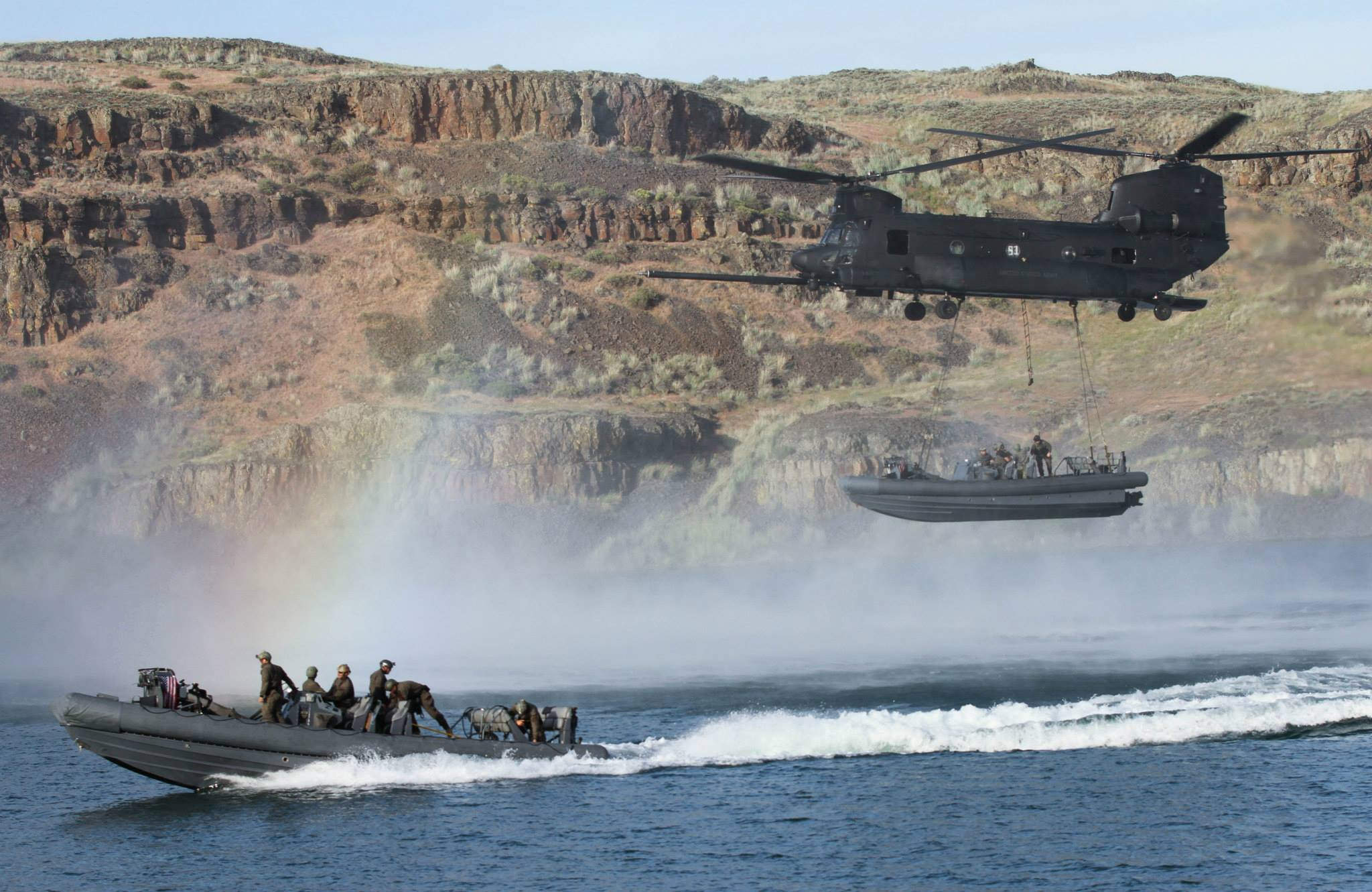
Special Boat Team 12 conducts MEATS exercise with the U.S. Army, 160th SOAR's MH-47 Chinook

SWCC personnel can also use Army CH-47 helicopters to insert and exfiltrate their boats, using slings dubbed the Maritime External Air Transportation System (MEATS).

== Neurological risks ==
In November 2024, The New York Times published reporting on the prevalence of chronic brain trauma among members of the Navy's Special Boat Teams. The investigation revealed that medical professionals were warning about the risk of brain injuries during missions, including warnings that boat crews could be subjected to sudden "jerks of up to 64 Gs" and suggested that some providers were concerned that the missions were contributing to neurological injuries such as chronic traumatic encephalopathy (C.T.E.). A group of 12 SWCC veterans, nearly all at the chief or senior-chief level, reported a range of symptoms including cognitive decline, impulsivity, depression, and violent behavior, often escalating as they progressed in their careers, attributing these issues to the physical impacts from the boats. According to the Times, nearly all of the approximately 300 respondents to a questionnaire reported experiencing concussion symptoms from their time on the boats, with most still facing these issues years later. Nearly a quarter indicated that they had experienced suicidal thoughts. However, as there is no public data from the Navy, and no blood test or brain scan exists that can definitively detect this type of damage in living brains, it remains unclear how many sailors have been injured. According to a Naval Special Warfare spokesperson, the risks to the boat crews "are well recognized," noting that boat team leaders are chosen for their "sustained superior performance" and undergo extensive testing.

A 2026 article from a group of researchers in the Department of Neurological Surgery at the University of Pittsburg looked at 198 Fast Boat Operators (FBO), 158 of which were SWCC, and found a high burden of neurocognitive symptoms. The study recruited FBO's from Facebook and relied on self-reported traumatic brain injuries (TBI) symptoms. Researchers emphasized that 45.5% of SBO's were diagnosed with TBI at some point in their careers, and 100% of those interviewed reported postconcussive symptoms after operating their boats. The study concluded that the G-forces received during boat operation may correlate with the high prevalence of neurocognitive changes, but there is still a need for more in-depth prospective studies. Additionally, the difference between the concussive forces experienced by the coastal SWCC, which is primarily related to wave impact, is different than the weapons-based concussive forces of the riverine troops, both of which require unique investigation.

== SWCC units ==
=== Naval Special Warfare Group 4 ===
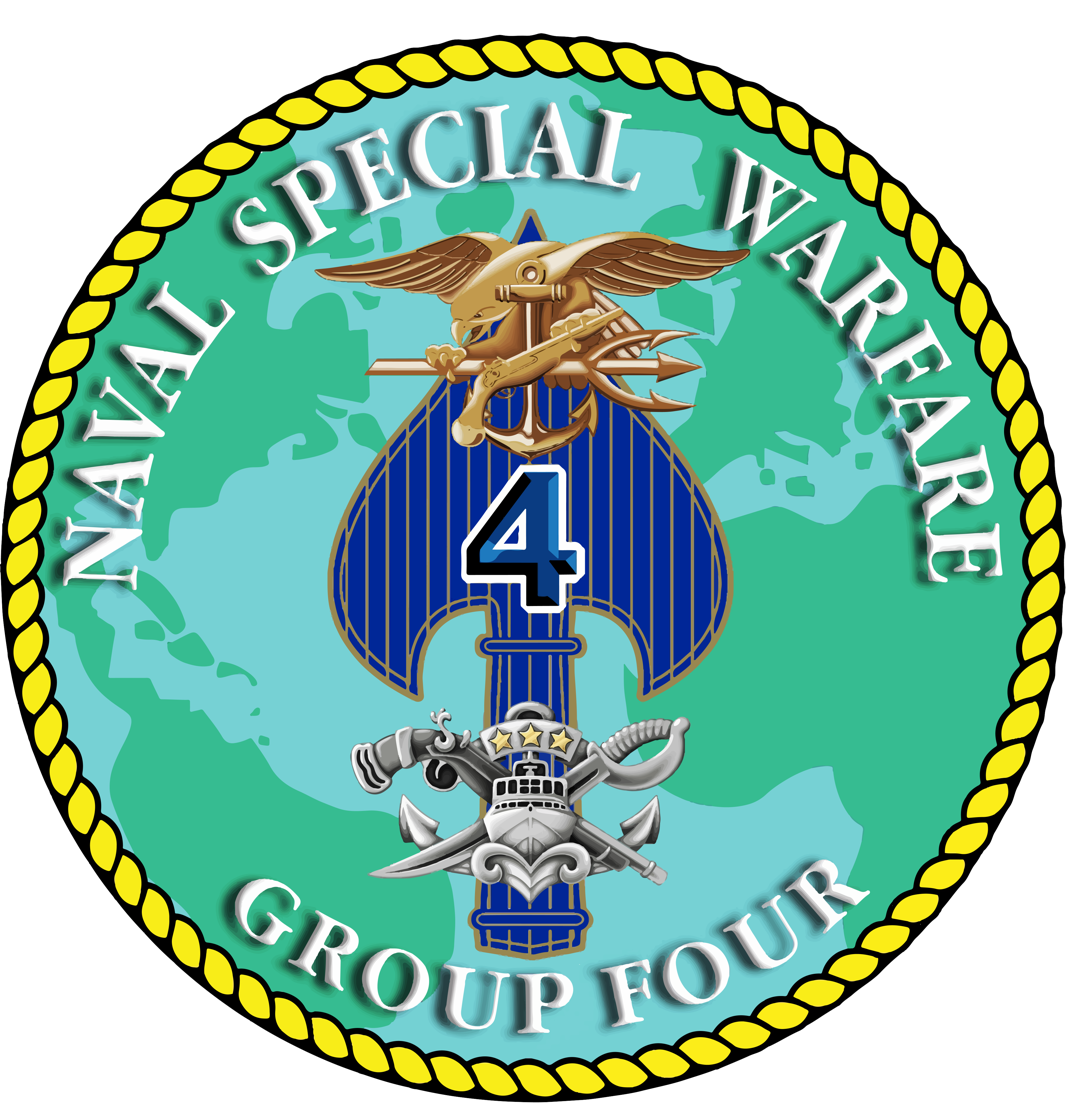

Insignia	Team	Deployment	HQ	Notes
	Special Boat Team 12	Worldwide	Naval Amphibious Base Coronado, California	
	Special Boat Team 20	Worldwide	Naval Amphibious Base Little Creek, Virginia	
	Special Boat Team 22	Worldwide	John C. Stennis Space Center, Mississippi	

== See also ==
- Naval Small Craft Instruction and Technical Training School (NAVSCIATTS)
- Special Missions Training Center (SMTC)
- United States Navy SEALs
- Mark V Special Operations Craft
- Special Operations Craft – Riverine (SOC-R)
- List of United States Navy enlisted warfare designations
- Badges of the United States Navy
- Military badges of the United States
- Uniforms of the United States Navy
- Obsolete badges of the United States military
