= 2013 raid on Barawe =

U.S. military operation in Somalia

- Part of the War in Somalia, the war on terror and Operation Enduring Freedom – Horn of Africa
Date	5 October 2013
Location	Barawe, Somalia
Result	SEAL Team Six withdrawal

Belligerents
(United States) SEAL Team Six	Al-Shabaab

Strength
24 Navy SEALs, unknown number of Navy SWCC (support element)	unknown

Casualties and losses
none	none

The 2013 raid on Baraawe was a military operation by SEAL Team Six to capture or kill Abdikadar Mohamed Abdikadar "Ikrima", a senior member of the al-Shabaab insurgent group. It was launched in the southern town of Barawa, Somalia, in October 2013.

== Operation ==
On 5 October 2013, Al-Shabaab spokesman Sheikh Abdiasis Abu Musab announced that Western naval forces had launched an assault on a house in the insurgent stronghold of Barawe, a town situated around 180 kilometres (110 mi) south of Mogadishu. He stated that the foreign soldiers had silencer guns, and exchanged gunfire and grenades with the militants before being driven away. Musab later asserted that the attack was launched by the UK SAS unit as well as Turkish special forces, and that one British commander was killed during the raid and four other SAS operatives were fatally wounded. Additionally, a Somali intelligence official indicated that a Chechen Al-Shabaab leader was the target of the mission, and that the insurgent commander was wounded during the offensive and one of his guards was killed.

Somali police stated that the operation had the approval of the Somali government, and that seven individuals were killed during the mission. Both NATO and EU Navfor denied involvement in the raid, as did a Turkish Foreign Ministry representative. A spokeswoman for the British Defence Ministry also said that she and her colleagues were not aware of any British involvement in the operation. According to another Somali intelligence official, the target of the raid was al-Shabaab leader Ahmed Godane (Mukhtar Abu Zubeyr). A senior US military representative also indicated that SEAL Team Six, the special operations unit responsible for killing Osama bin Laden in Pakistan in 2011, launched the offensive but later abandoned the mission after coming under more fire than expected. Speaking about the aborted mission, US secretary of state John Kerry said that the insurgents "can run but they can't hide". A spokesman for the Pentagon likewise asserted that US soldiers had been involved in a counter-terrorism mission in Somalia against a known Al-Shabaab member, but did not elaborate. He also indicated that there were no US fatalities during the operation. US officials later confirmed that the target of the raid was Al-Shabaab commander Abdikadar Mohamed Abdikadar "Ikrima".
