= Naval Small Craft Instruction and Technical Training School =

- NAVSCIATTS insignia
- Active: June 1969
- Country: United States
- Branch: United States Navy
- Type: Special Operations training
- Role: NAVSCIATTS mission is to foster increased levels of operational capabilities and readiness in Allied and Friendly forces.
- Part of: United States Naval Special Warfare Command; Naval Special Warfare Center
- Garrison/HQ: John C. Stennis Space Center, Mississippi, US

The Naval Small Craft Instruction and Technical Training School (NAVSCIATTS) is one of the three original Panama Canal Area Military Schools along with the Western Hemisphere Institute for Security Cooperation (previously called U.S. Army School of the Americas) and the Inter-American Air Forces Academy. It is located at John C. Stennis Space Center in Mississippi.

== History ==
NAVSCIATTS traces its history to the U.S. Coast Guard Mobile Training Team (MTT) sent to the Panama Canal Zone as a result of agreements made during the 1961Alliance for Progress Conference in San José, Costa Rica. During this initial deployment, the need for a permanent training facility was recognized and the U.S. Coast Guard based the Small Craft Inspection and Training Team (SCIATT) at the Rodman Naval Station in Panama in May 1963. Operation of the team was transferred to the U.S. Navy in June 1969 and it was re-designated as the Small Craft Instruction and Technical Team. As a result of increased training demands, NAVSCIATTS was officially established as a Naval shore activity in October 1982 and formally established as a Naval shore command in July 1983.

The 1977 Torrijos–Carter Treaties abolished the Panama Canal Zone and transferred control of the Panama Canal to the government of Panama. The anticipated closure of U.S. military facilities in the Panama Canal Zone resulted in the relocation of NAVSCIATTS to the Stennis Space Center in Mississippi where the riverine and coastal areas provided an ideal training area.

== Courses ==
The school presently offers the below formal courses of instruction in both Spanish and English at various times throughout the year. Many courses are taught by several select members of the Special Warfare Combatant-craft Crewmen, SEALs, and USCG Deployable Specialized Forces. The school currently offers several courses specializing in small craft strategy, operations, communications, weapons, and maintenance. NAVSCIATT has trained nearly 1,000 foreign partner nation forces and other international students.

- Patrol Craft Operations in a Riverine Environment: (PCOR) Eight-week course consists of instruction in patrol craft familiarization, first aid, mission planning, navigation, weapons training and tactics, patrol craft movement and formations. A riverine and medical training exercise is conducted to ensure that all students have accomplished course objectives.
- Patrol Craft Propulsion Systems Overhaul: Eight-week course consists of detailed instruction in the 6Vseries 92 TA Detroit Diesel engine specifications and characteristics, operating principles, lubrication, cooling, air and fuel systems. Training includes a complete overhaul including disassembly, troubleshooting, inspection, cleaning, repair, tune-up and reassembly of the rebuilt engine, Twin Disc transmission maintenance, service and the practical application techniques to include an engine tune-up on a Caterpillar Inc. 3126 Diesel engine. In addition, students will learn tools and their uses, precision measuring instruments and shop safety.
- Patrol Craft Hull Maintenance: Eight-week course consists of instruction in hand tools, oxyacetylene welding and cutting, electric arc welding, aluminum MIG welding, fiberglass repair, and inflatable boat repair. Practical applications of techniques are employed in all areas of instruction to accomplish course objectives.
- Outboard Motor Maintenance and Overhaul: Eight-week course consists of engineering fundamentals, internal combustion theory, electrical and fuel systems, gear case and power head overhaul. Practical application techniques train the student to reference the manufacturer's technical manual utilizing Bombardier 150HP outboard motors as training aids.
- Patrol Craft Weapons Maintenance: Four-week course consists of instruction in various individual small arms and patrol craft mounted weapons to include the M-1911A1 and P-226 pistols; M-14, M16 and AK-47 rifles; Mossberg 500A1 shotgun; M79 and M203 grenade launchers; M-60E, M2 HB .50 and MK-19 MOD3 M2 machine guns; weapon and ammunition fundamentals. Practical application techniques include malfunction analysis, disassembly, inspection, cleaning, and troubleshooting on all weapons is employed to accomplish course objectives.
- Instructor Development Course: Two-week course consists of planning learning objectives, development of lesson topic guides, methods and techniques of instruction, and effective classroom communication with an emphasis on practical applications. Students will give a minimum of six practical oral presentations that will be video taped and critiqued by the instructors and classmates.
- Rule of Law and Disciplined Military Operations: This one-week course includes considerations of such fundamental concerns as rules of engagement, laws of armed conflict and the role of a military law justice system in accomplishing military objectives.

== See also ==
- US Navy Small Craft Training Center of World War II
- Special Missions Training Center
