= United States Navy ships =

The names of commissioned ships of the United States Navy all start with USS, for United States Ship. Non-commissioned, primarily civilian-crewed vessels of the U.S. Navy under the Military Sealift Command have names that begin with USNS, standing for United States Naval Ship. A letter-based hull classification symbol is used to designate a vessel's type. The names of ships are selected by the secretary of the Navy. The names are those of states, cities, towns, important persons, important locations, famous battles, fish, and ideals. Usually, different types of ships have names originated from different types of sources.

Modern aircraft carriers and submarines use nuclear reactors for power. See United States naval reactors for information on classification schemes and the history of nuclear-powered vessels.

Modern cruisers, destroyers and frigates are called surface combatants and act mainly as escorts for aircraft carriers, amphibious assault ships, auxiliaries and civilian craft, but the largest ones have gained a land attack role through the use of cruise missiles and a population defense role through missile defense.

== Aircraft carriers ==
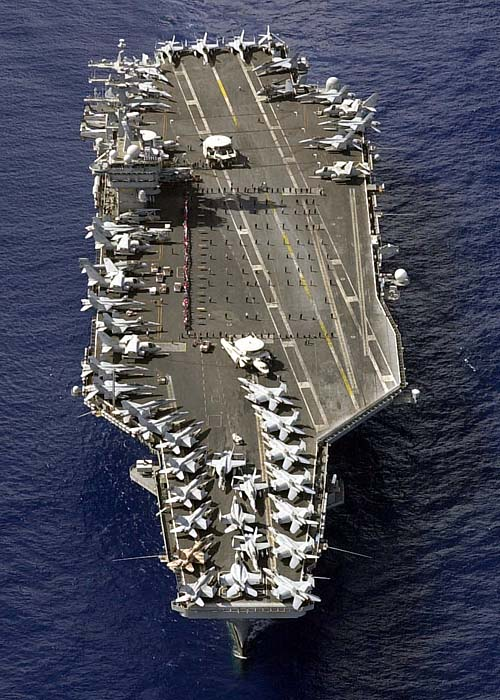
U.S. Navy supercarrier USS Nimitz on November 3, 2003. Approximately forty-six aircraft are visible on the flight deck.

Aircraft carriers (CVN) have the ability to put most nations within striking distance of U.S. air power which makes them the cornerstone of US forward deployment and deterrence strategy. Multiple carriers are deployed around the world to provide military presence, respond quickly to crises, and participate in joint exercises with allied forces; this has led the Navy to refer to their Nimitz-class carriers as "4.5 acres of sovereign and mobile American territory". "In accordance with customary international law as reflected in United Nations Convention on the Law of the Sea and as discussed in The Commander's Handbook on the Law of Naval Operations and The State Department Cable on the Status of Military Sealift Command Vessels, ships owned or operated by a State and used, for the time being, only on government non-commercial service are entitled to sovereign immunity.

Whether in internal, territorial, or international waters, such ships are immune from arrest and search, and exempt from foreign taxation and any foreign regulation requiring flying the flag of that foreign state while in its ports or territorial sea." Former president Bill Clinton summed up the importance of the aircraft carrier by stating that "when word of crisis breaks out in Washington, it's no accident the first question that comes to everyone's lips is: where is the nearest carrier?" The power and operational flexibility of a carrier lie in the aircraft of its carrier air wing. Made up of both fixed-wing and rotary-wing aircraft, a carrier air wing is able to perform over 150 strike missions at once, hitting over 700 targets a day.

Carrier air wings also protect friendly forces, conduct electronic warfare, assist in special operations, and carry out search and rescue missions. The carriers themselves, in addition to enabling airborne operations, serve as command platforms for large battle groups or multinational task forces. U.S. Navy aircraft carriers can also host aircraft from other nations' navies; the French Navy's Rafale has operated, during naval exercises, from U.S. Navy flight decks.

- Nimitz class (10 in active service)
- Gerald R. Ford class (1 in active service, 1 under construction of 10 planned)

== Amphibious warfare ships ==
=== Amphibious assault ships ===
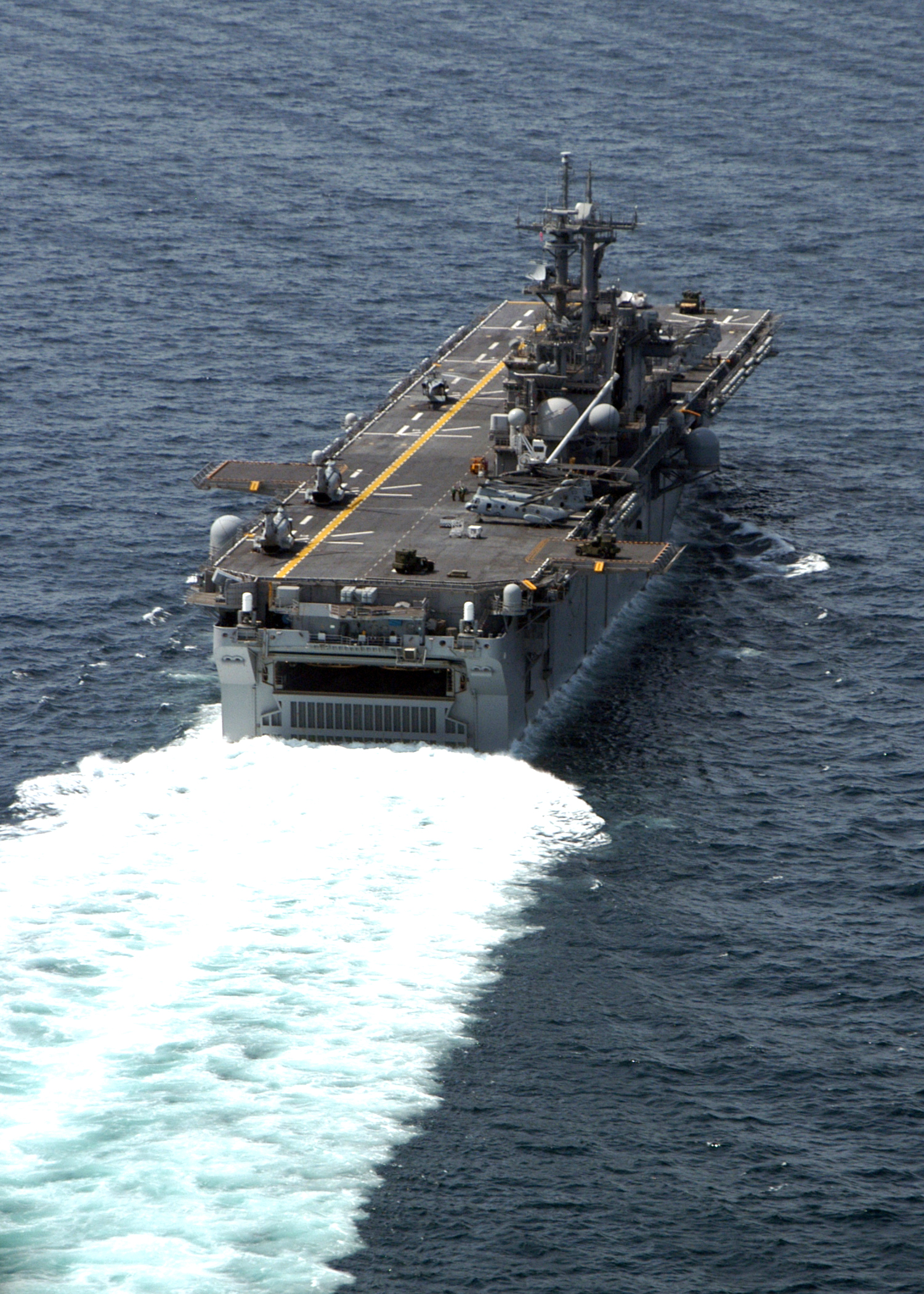
U.S. Navy amphibious assault ship USS Kearsarge (LHD-3)

Amphibious assault ships, sub-types known as landing, helicopter dock or LHD and landing, helicopter assault or LHA. (also referred to as a commando carrier or an amphibious assault carrier), are a type of amphibious warfare ship employed to land and support ground forces on enemy territory by an amphibious assault. The design evolved from aircraft carriers converted for use as helicopter carriers, but includes support for amphibious landing craft, with most designs including a well deck. Coming full circle, some amphibious assault ships now have a secondary role as aircraft carriers, supporting V/STOL fixed-wing aircraft.

The role of the amphibious assault ship is fundamentally different from a standard aircraft carrier: its aviation facilities have the primary role of hosting helicopters to support forces ashore rather than to support strike aircraft. However, some are capable of serving in the sea-control role, embarking aircraft like Harrier fighters for CAP and anti-submarine warfare helicopters or operating as a safe base for large numbers of STOVL fighters conducting air support for the Marine expeditionary unit once it has gone ashore. Most of these ships can also carry or support landing craft, such as air-cushioned landing craft (hovercraft) or LCUs.

- Wasp class (7 in active service)
- America class (2 in active service of 11 planned)

=== Amphibious command ships ===
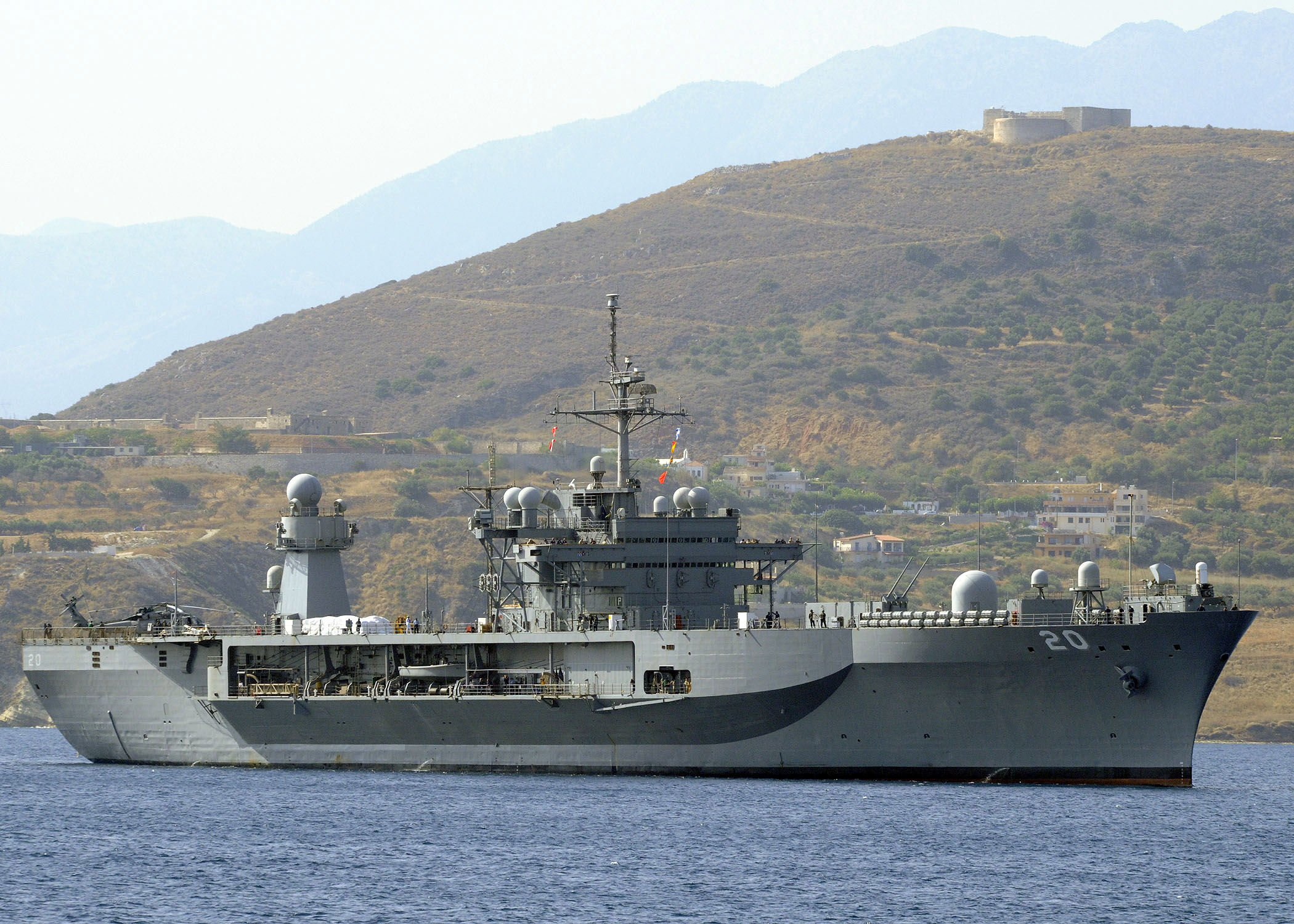
USS Mount Whitney

Amphibious command ships (LCC) of the United States Navy are large, special purpose ships, originally designed to command large amphibious invasions. However, as amphibious invasions have become less likely, they are now used as general command ships, and serve as floating headquarters for two, forward deployed, numbered Fleet commands. Currently, they are assigned to the 6th and 7th fleets as flagships.

- Blue Ridge class (2 in active service)

=== Amphibious transport docks ===
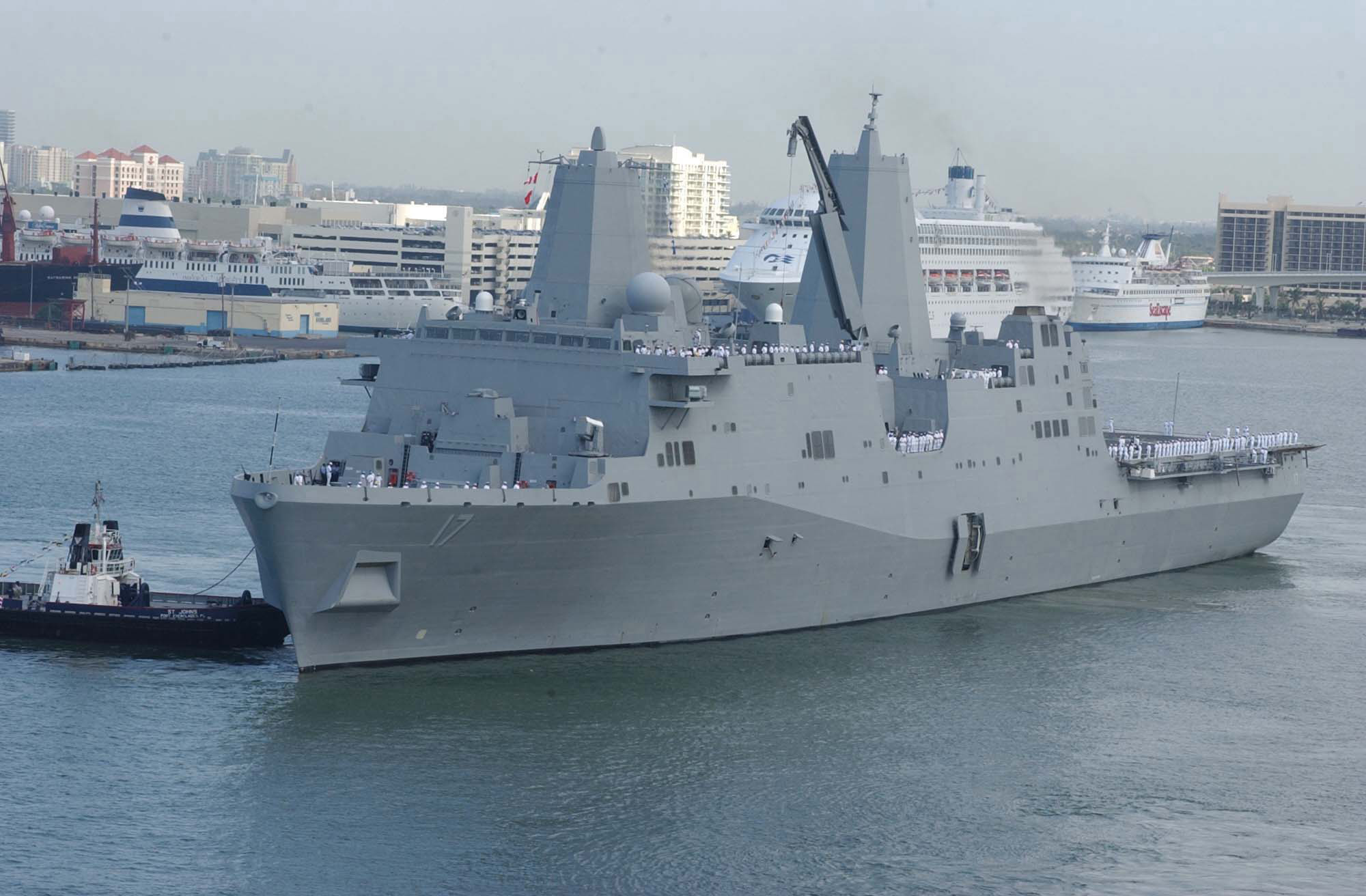
U.S. Navy amphibious transport dock USS San Antonio (LPD-17)

Amphibious transport docks, also known as landing platform dock or LPD, is an amphibious warfare ship, a warship that embarks, transports, and lands elements of a landing force for expeditionary warfare missions. Several navies currently operate this kind of ship. The ships are generally designed to transport troops into a war zone by sea, primarily using landing craft, although invariably they also have the capability to operate transport, utility and attack helicopters and multi-mission tilt-rotor aircraft.

- San Antonio class (12 in active service of 17 planned)

=== Dock landing ships ===
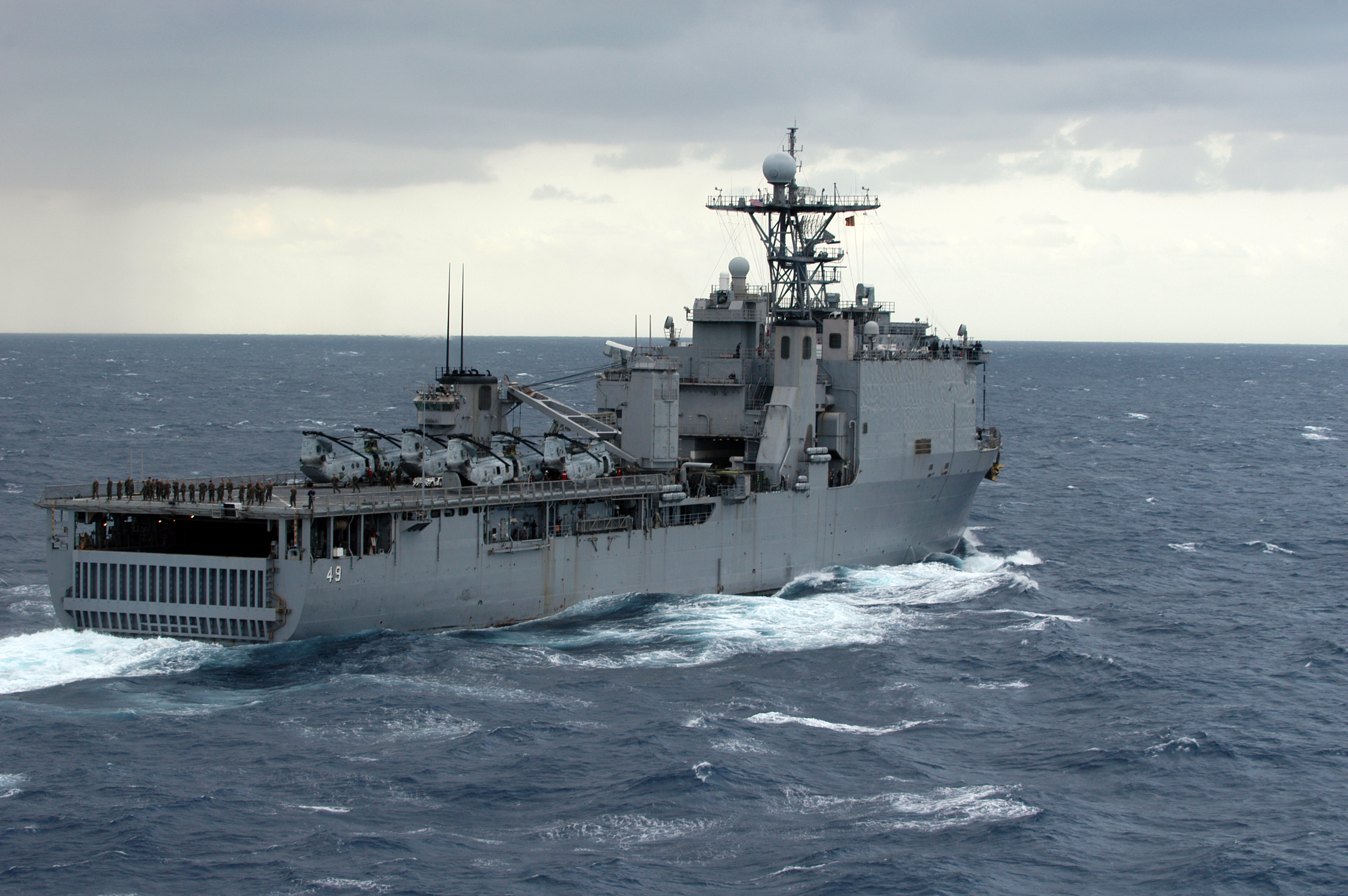
USS Harpers Ferry, a United States Navy dock landing ship

Dock landing ships, also known as landing ship, dock or LSD, are amphibious warfare ships with well docks to transport and launch landing craft and amphibious vehicles. Some ships with well decks, such as the Soviet Ivan Rogov class, also have bow doors to enable them to deliver vehicles directly onto a beach (like a Landing Ship, Tank). Modern dock landing ships also operate helicopters.

A ship with a well deck (docking well) can transfer cargo to landing craft in rougher seas than a ship that has to use cranes or a stern ramp. The US Navy hull classification symbol for a ship with a well deck depends on its facilities for aircraft - a (modern) LSD has a helicopter deck, an LPD also has a hangar, and an LHD or LHA has a full-length flight deck.

- Whidbey Island class (5 in active service)
- Harpers Ferry class (4 in active service)

=== Expeditionary mobile base ===
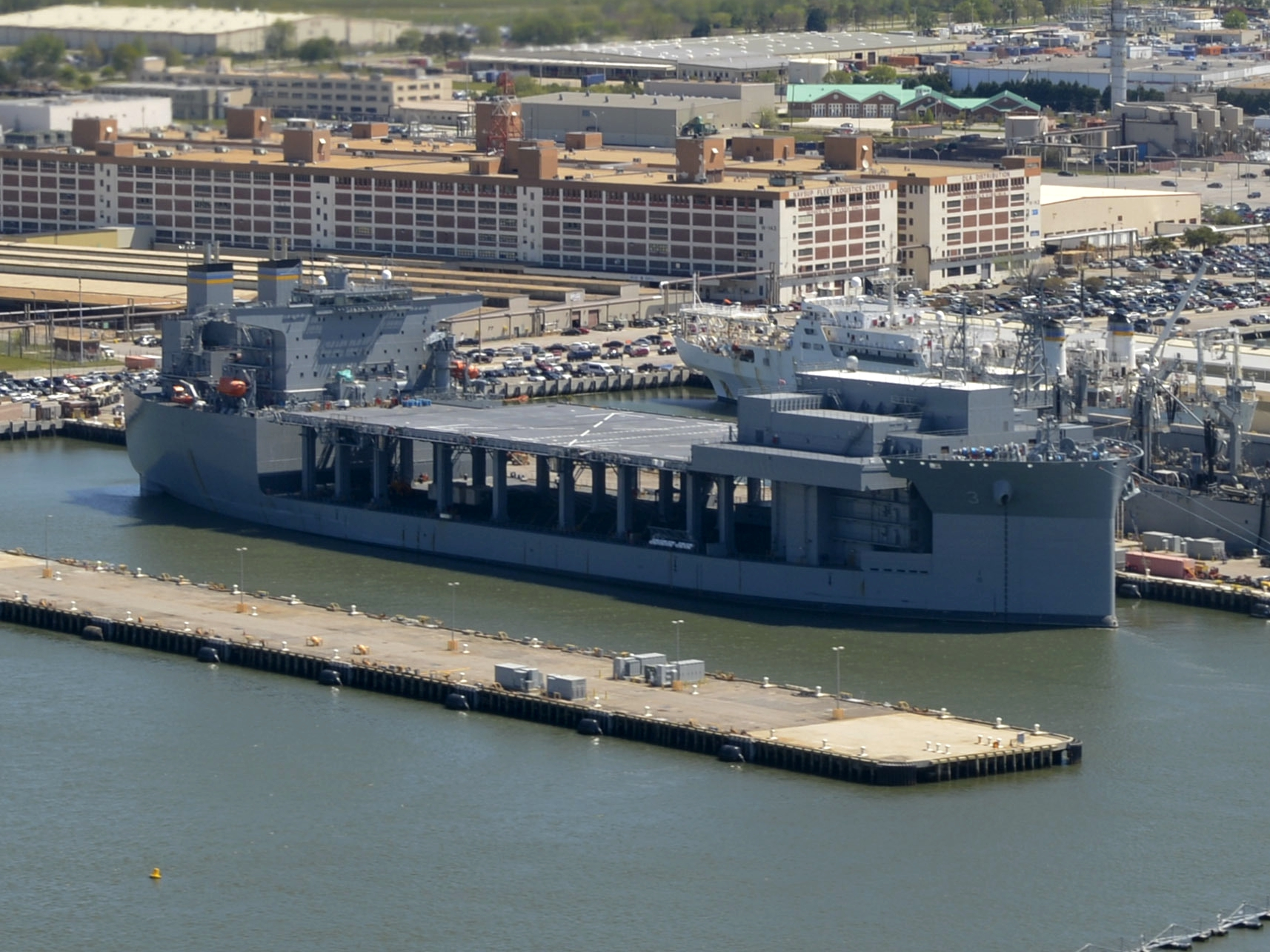
USS Lewis B. Puller, a United States Navy expeditionary mobile base

Expeditionary mobile bases are semi-submersible, flexible, modular platforms that perform large-scale logistics movements such as the transfer of vehicles and equipment from sea to shore. These ships significantly reduce the dependency on foreign ports and provide support in the absence of port availability.

- Lewis B. Puller class (4 in active service of 6 planned)

== Cruisers ==
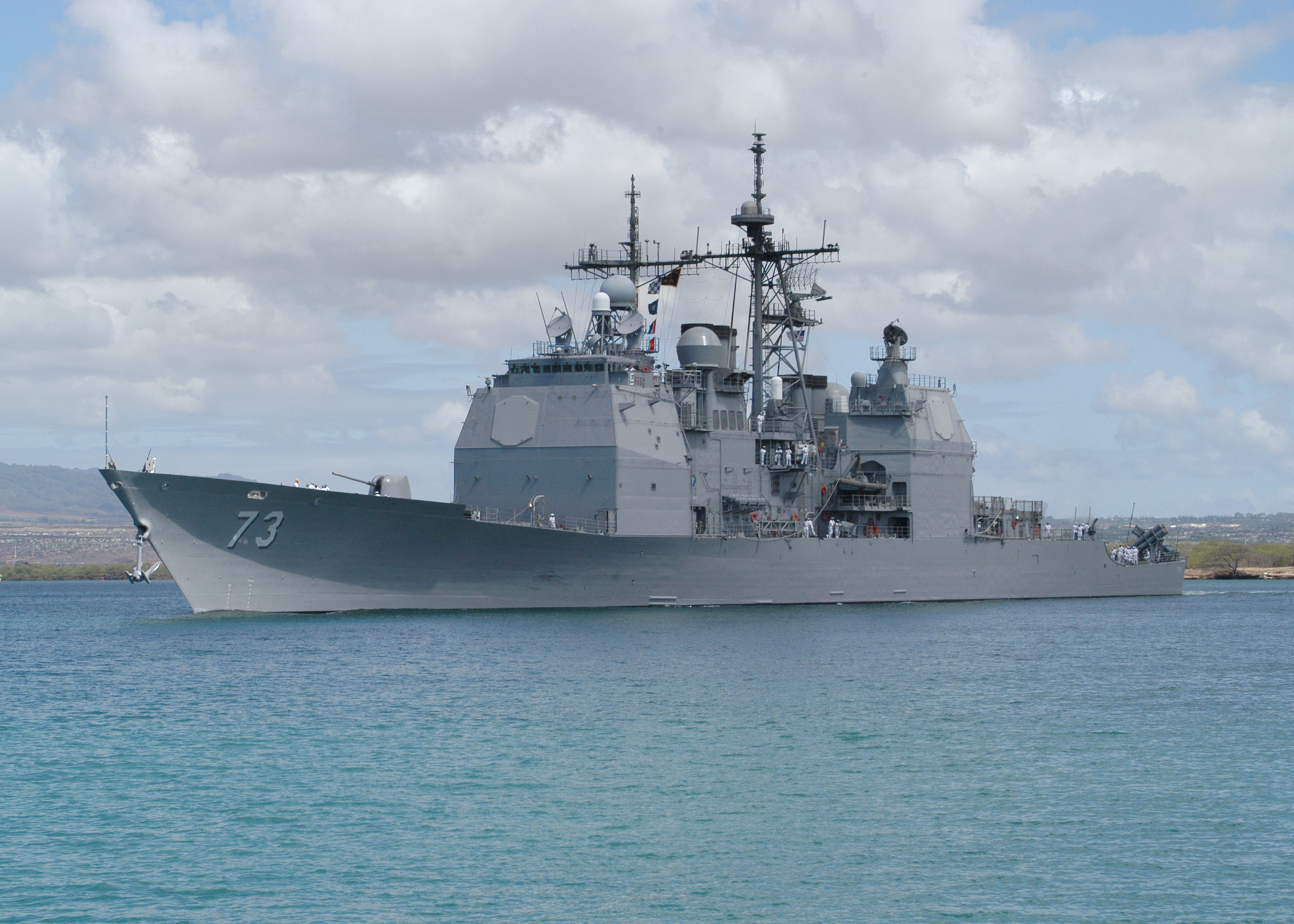
USS Port Royal, a Ticonderoga-class cruiser.

Cruisers and Guided missile cruisers (CG) are a type of warship. The term has been in use for several hundred years, and has had different meanings throughout this period. During the Age of Sail, the term cruising referred to certain kinds of missions – independent scouting, raiding or commerce protection – fulfilled by a frigate or sloop, which were the cruising warships of a fleet.

In the middle of the 19th century, cruiser came to be a classification for the ships intended for this kind of role, though cruisers came in a wide variety of sizes, from the small protected cruiser to armored cruisers that were as large (although not as powerful) as a battleship.

By the early 20th century, cruisers could be placed on a consistent scale of warship size, smaller than a battleship but larger than a destroyer. In 1922, the Washington Naval Treaty placed a formal limit on cruisers, which were defined as warships of up to 10,000 tons displacement carrying guns no larger than 8 inches in calibre. These limits shaped cruisers until the end of World War II. The very large battlecruisers of the World War I era were now classified, along with battleships, as capital ships.

In the later 20th century, the obsolescence of the battleship left the cruiser as the largest and most powerful surface combatant (excluding aircraft carriers). The role of the cruiser varied according to ship and navy, often including air defense, commerce raiding, and shore bombardment. The U.S. Navy in the Cold War period built guided-missile cruisers primarily designed to provide air defense, while the navy of the USSR built battlecruisers with heavy anti-ship missiles designed to sink NATO carrier task forces.

- Ticonderoga class (27 completed; 5 in active service, 22 retired) – the first ship class with the AEGIS combat system

== Destroyers ==
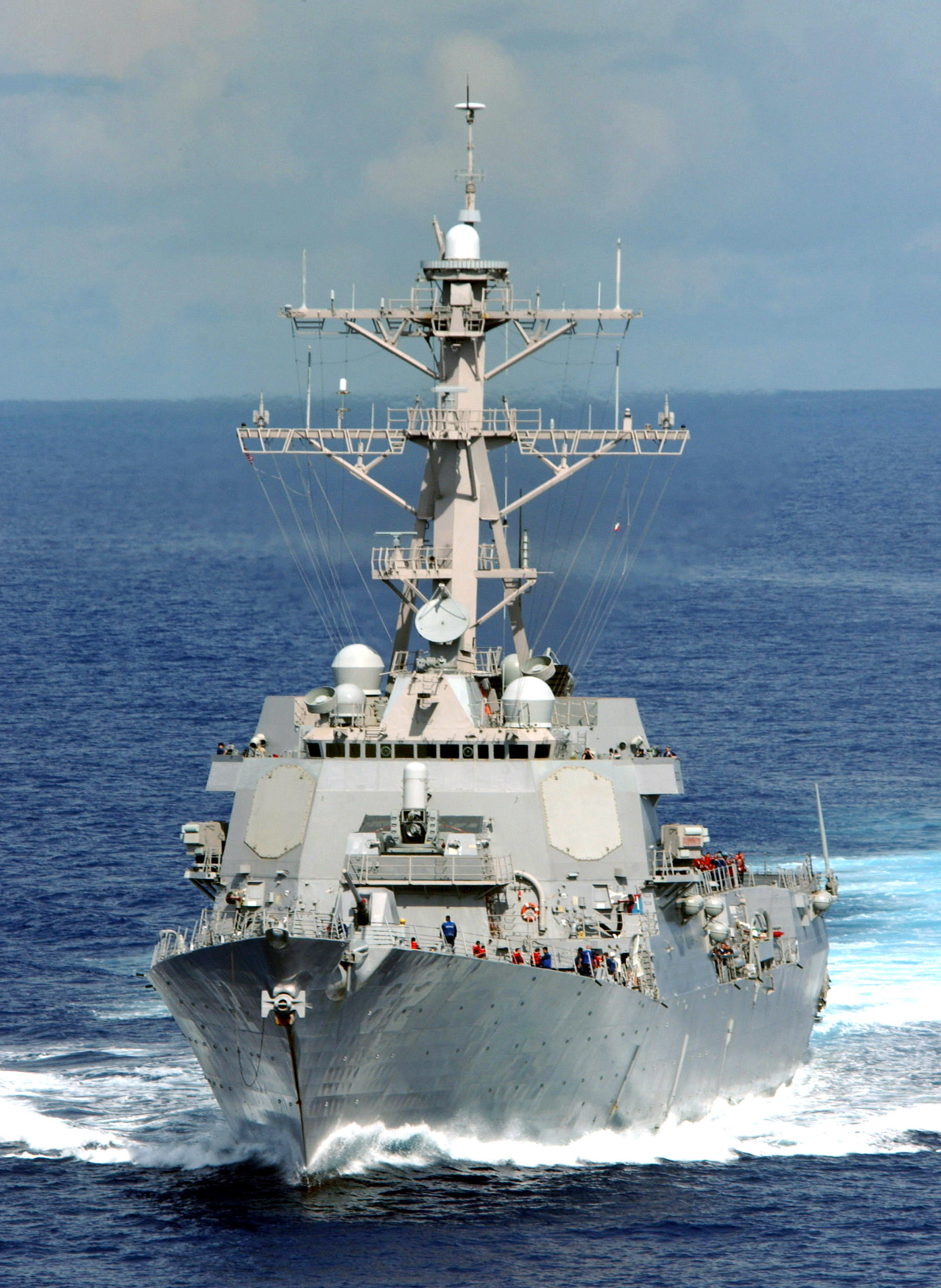
A U.S. Navy guided-missile destroyer, USS Lassen

Destroyers DDG are fast maneuverable long-endurance warships intended to escort larger vessels in a fleet, convoy or battle group and defend them against smaller powerful short-range attackers. They were originally developed in the late 19th century as a defense against torpedo boats, and by the time of the Russo-Japanese War in 1904, these "torpedo boat destroyers" (TBD) were "large, swift, and powerfully armed torpedo boats designed to destroy other torpedo boats."

Before World War II, destroyers were light vessels with little endurance for unattended ocean operations; typically a number of destroyers and a single destroyer tender operated together. After the war, the advent of the guided missile allowed destroyers to take on the surface combatant roles previously filled by battleships and cruisers. This resulted in larger and more powerful guided missile destroyers more capable of independent operation.

At the start of the 21st century, destroyers are the heaviest surface combatant ships in general use, with only two nations (United States and Russia) currently operating the heavier class cruisers, with no battleships or true battlecruisers remaining. Modern destroyers, also known as guided missile destroyers, are equivalent in tonnage but vastly superior in firepower to cruisers of the World War II era, capable of carrying nuclear tipped cruise missiles. Guided missile destroyers such as the Arleigh Burke class are actually larger and more heavily armed than most previous ships classified as guided missile cruisers, due to their massive size at 510 feet (160 m) long, displacement (8200-9700 tons) and armament of over 90 missiles.

Guided-missile destroyers are destroyers designed to launch guided missiles. Many are also equipped to carry out anti-submarine, anti-air, and anti-surface operations. The NATO standard designation for these vessels is DDG. Nations vary in their use of destroyer D designation their hull pennant numbering, either prefixing, or dropping it altogether. The U.S. Navy has adopted the classification DDG in the American hull classification system.

In addition to the guns that destroyers have, a guided-missile destroyer is usually equipped with two large missile magazines, usually in vertical-launch cells. Some guided-missile destroyers contain powerful radar systems, such as the United States’ Aegis Combat System, and may be adopted for use in an anti-missile or ballistic-missile defense role. This is especially true of navies that no longer operate cruisers, as other vessels must be adopted to fill in the gap.

- Arleigh Burke class (71 in active service, 7 under construction of 87 planned)
- Zumwalt class (2 in active service, 1 under sea trials)

== Frigates ==
Frigates FF or FFG (according to the modern classification of U.S. navy warships) are smaller ships than destroyers. They are designed primarily to protect other ships (such as merchant convoys), and perform some Anti-Submarine Warfare duties. They are cheaper but of more limited capability than destroyers. The last active class of frigates in the US Navy was the Oliver Hazard Perry class, decommissioned in September 2015, leaving the navy no active frigates.

On 15 January 2015, U.S. Navy secretary Ray Mabus announced that ships of the Littoral Combat Ship (LCS) classes built in the future would be re-classified as "frigates". This would apply only to the future variations of these ships. Current ships will retain the LCS classification unless and until they are upgraded to the standards of the newer ships.

On 30 April 2020, the US Navy awarded a contract to design and produce the next generation small surface combatant, the Guided Missile Frigate (FFG(X)). The contract for detail design and construction (DD&C) of up to 10 Guided Missile Frigates (consisting of one base ship and nine option ships) was awarded to Fincantieri Marinette Marine Corporation (MMC) of Marinette, Wisconsin. The FFG(X) will have multi-mission capability to conduct air warfare, anti-submarine warfare, surface warfare, electronic warfare, and information operations. Specifically FFG(X) will include an Enterprise Air Surveillance Radar (EASR) radar, Baseline Ten (BL10) AEGIS Combat System, a Mk 41 Vertical Launch System (VLS), communications systems, MK 57 Gun Weapon System (GWS) countermeasures and added capability in the EW/IO area with design flexibility for future growth.

- Constellation class (2 on order, 18 cancelled)
- FF(X) (50-65 planned)

== Littoral combat ships ==
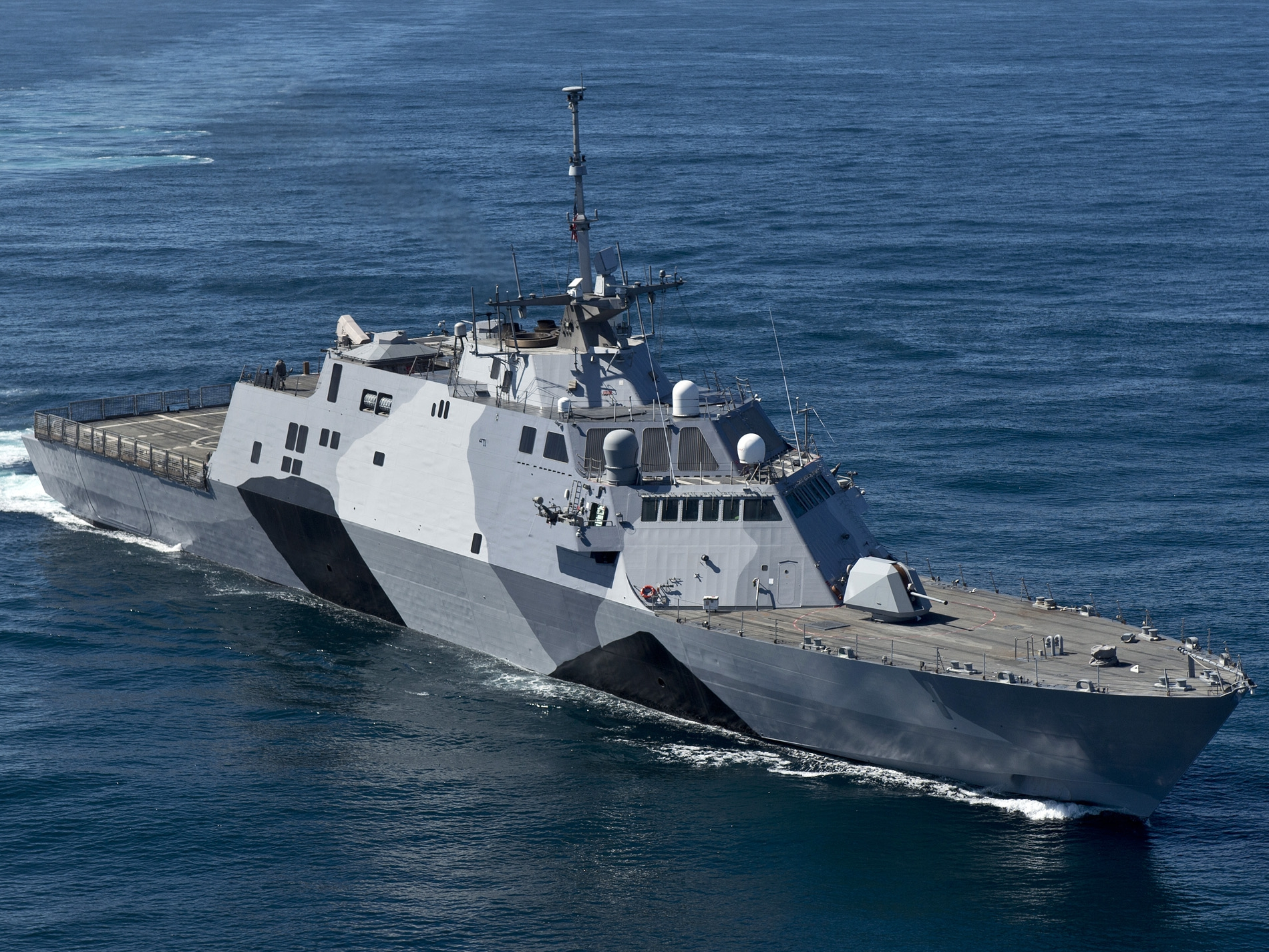
USS Freedom (LCS-1) Freedom-class littoral combat ship

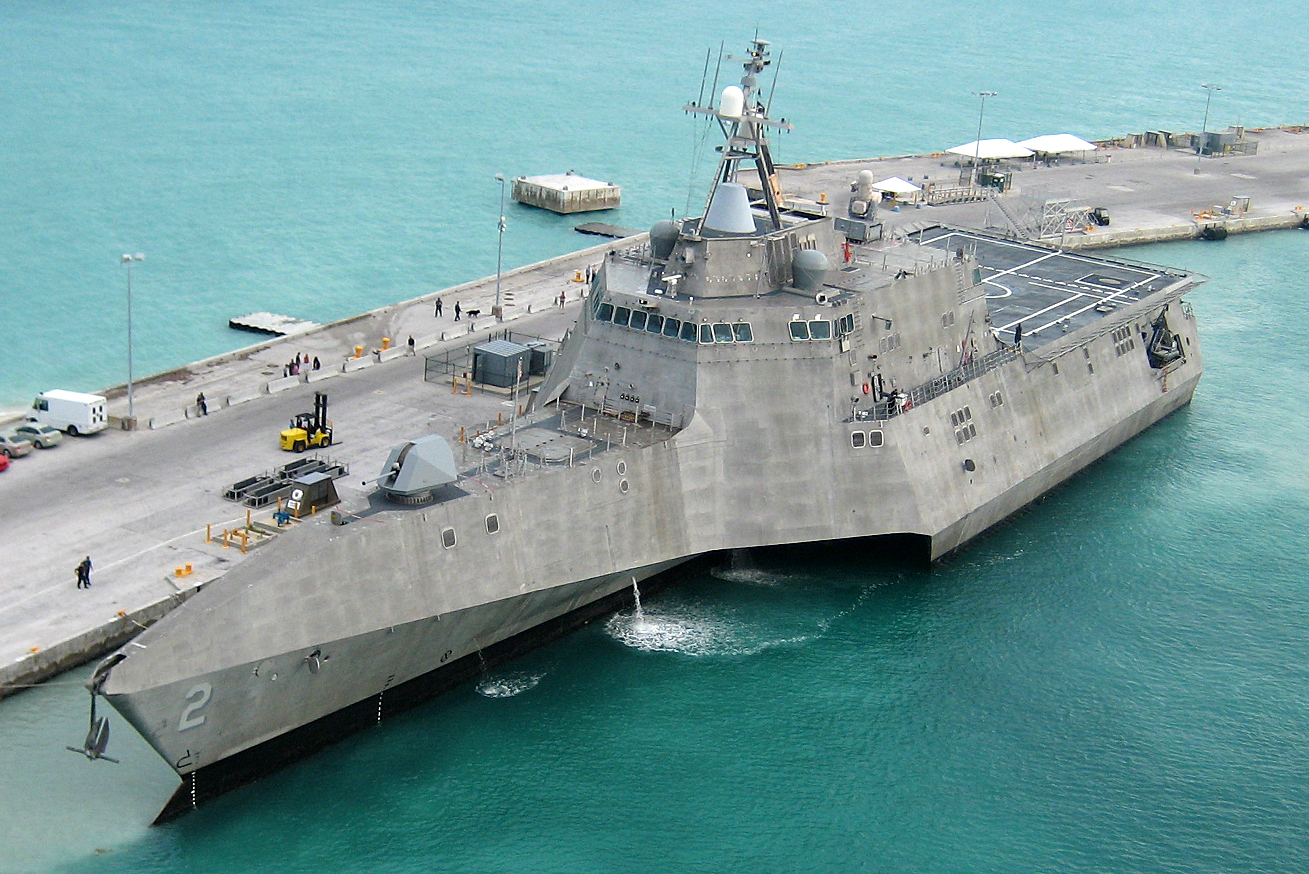
USS Independence (LCS-2) Independence-class littoral combat ship

Littoral combat ships LCS are a class of relatively small surface vessels intended for operations in the littoral zone (close to shore) by the United States Navy. It was "envisioned to be a networked, agile, stealthy surface combatant capable of defeating anti-access and asymmetric threats in the littorals."

The Freedom class and the Independence class are the first two LCS variants. Both are slightly smaller than the U.S. Navy's guided missile frigates and have been likened to corvettes. They have the capabilities of a small assault transport, including a flight deck and hangar for housing two SH-60 or MH-60 Seahawk helicopters, a stern ramp for operating small boats, and the cargo volume and payload to deliver a small assault force with fighting vehicles to a roll-on/roll-off port facility. Standard armaments include Mk 110 57 mm guns and RIM-116 Rolling Airframe Missiles. They are also equipped with autonomous air, surface, and underwater vehicles. Possessing lower air defense and surface warfare capabilities than destroyers, the LCS concept emphasizes speed, flexible mission modules and a shallow draft.

The first littoral combat ship, USS Freedom, was commissioned on 8 November 2008 in Veteran's Park, Milwaukee, Wisconsin. The second ship, and first of the trimaran design, USS Independence, was commissioned on 16 January 2010, in Mobile, Alabama. In 2012, CNO Jonathan W. Greenert stated that LCSs would be deployed to Africa in place of destroyers and cruisers. In late 2014, the Navy proceeded with a procurement plan for enhanced versions of the LCS and upgraded older ships to meet the program's 52-ship requirement; the modified LCS will be redesignated as FF. In December 2015, Secretary of Defense Ashton Carter ordered the Navy to reduce the planned LCS/FF procurement from 52 to 40, and downselect to one variant by FY 2019.

It was announced in January 2015 that future and retrofitted versions of these two classes will be re-classified as frigates. The navy has currently built out to 35 of a total of 52 ships.

- Freedom class (11 in active service, 5 retired)
- Independence (17 in active service, 2 retired)

== Mine countermeasures ships ==
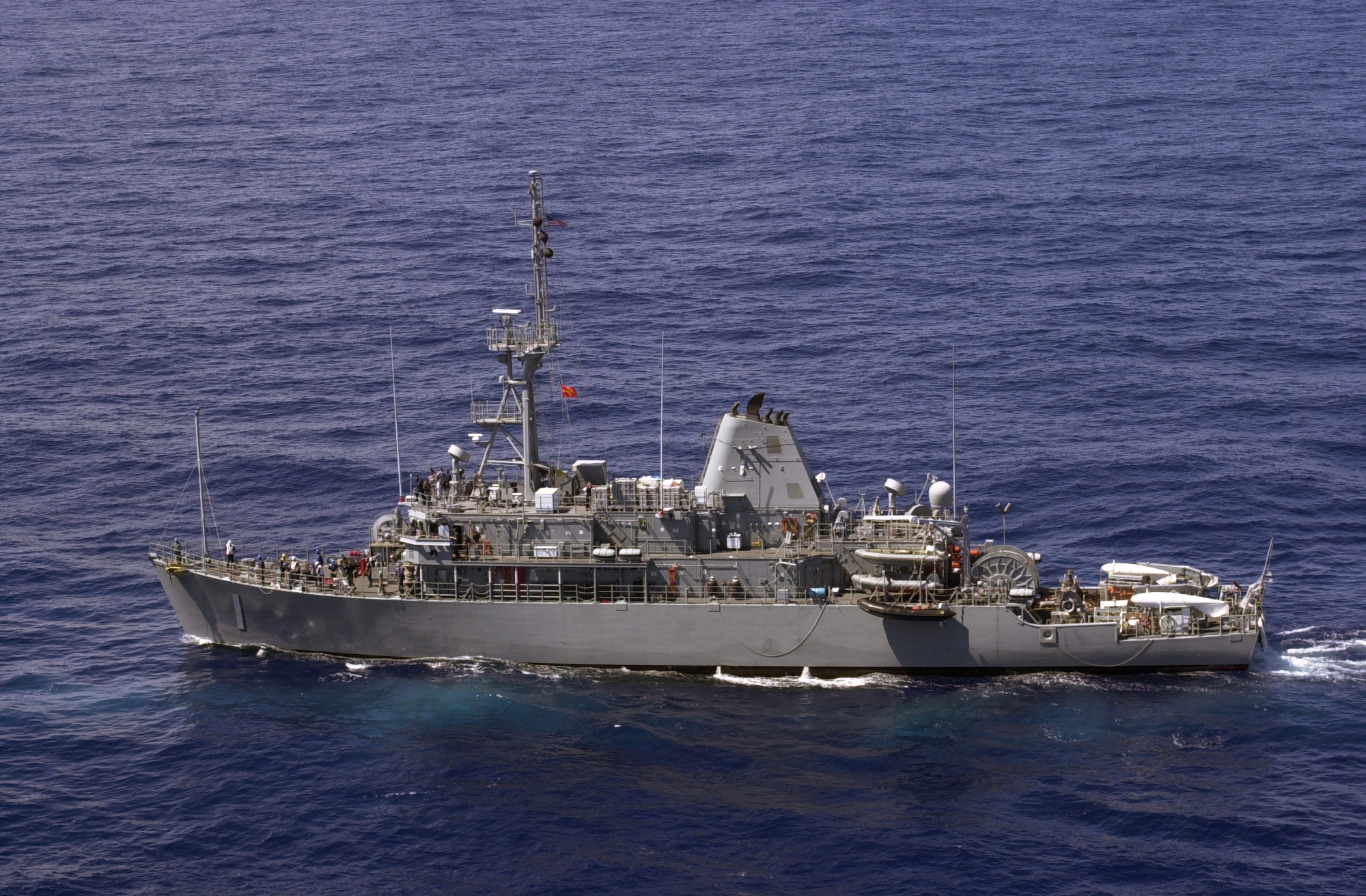
A U.S. Navy mine countermeasures ship, USS Avenger (MCM-1)

Mine countermeasures vessels or MCM are a type of naval ship designed for the location of and destruction of naval mines which combines the role of a minesweeper and minehunter in one hull. The term MCMV is also applied collectively to minehunters and minesweepers.

A "minesweeper" is a small naval warship designed to engage in minesweeping. Using various mechanisms intended to counter the threat posed by naval mines, waterways are maintained clear for safe shipping.

A "minehunter" is a naval vessel that actively detects and destroys individual naval mines.

- Avenger class (8 of 14 in active service, 5 decommissioned, 1 lost to accident)

== Patrol ships ==
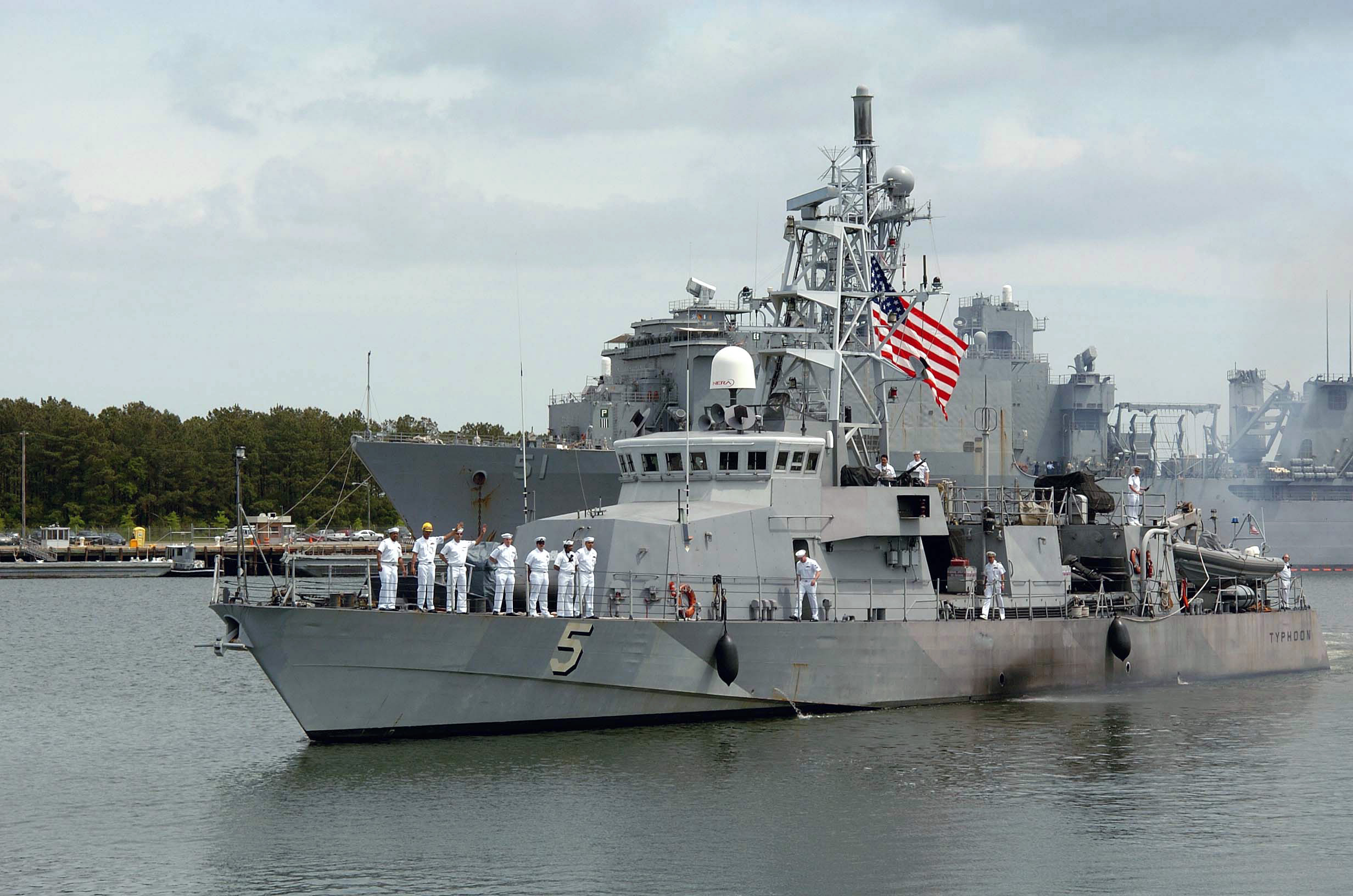
USS Typhoon (PC-5)

Patrol ships PC are relatively small naval vessels generally designed for coastal defense duties. There have been many designs for patrol boats. They may be operated by a nation's navy, coast guard, police force or customs and may be intended for marine (blue water) and/or estuarine or river ("brown water") environments. They are commonly found engaged in various border protection roles, including anti-smuggling, anti-piracy, fisheries patrols, and immigration law enforcement. They are also often called upon to participate in rescue operations. Vessels of this type include the original yacht (from Dutch/Low German jacht meaning hunting or hunt), a light, fast-sailing vessel used by the Dutch navy to pursue pirates and other transgressors around and into shallow waters.

- Cyclone class (14 built, none in active service, all transferred to the Philippine Navy or other navies)

== Submarines ==
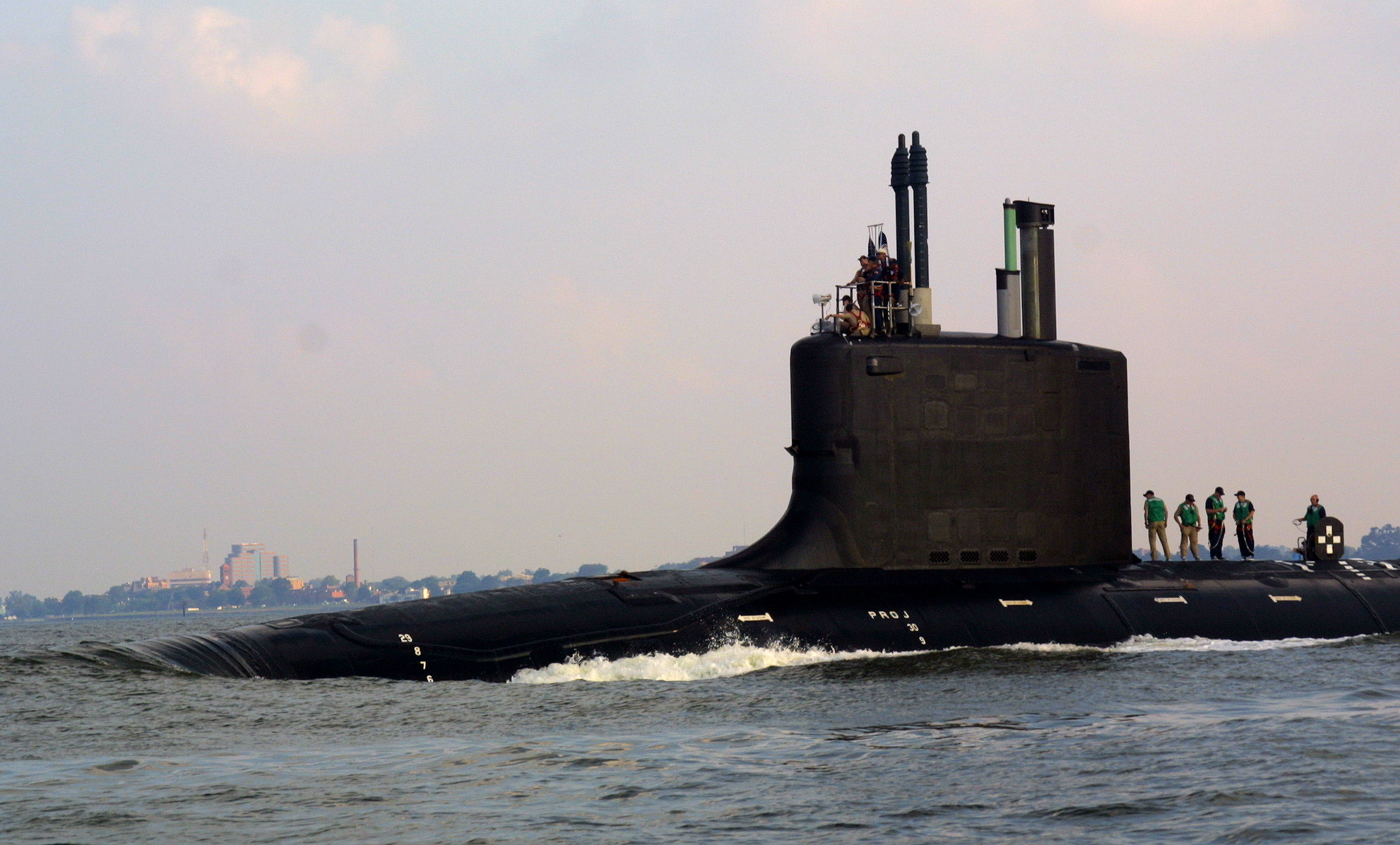
USS Virginia, an attack submarine

Submarines SSN, SSBN, SSGN are watercraft capable of independent operation underwater. There are currently two types; attack and ballistic. "Attack submarines" (SSN) have tactical missions, including controlling naval and shipping activity, serving as cruise missile-launching platforms, and intelligence-gathering. "Ballistic submarines" (SSBN) primarily have the single strategic mission of nuclear deterrence by being hidden launching-platforms for nuclear SLBMs. However, some of these boats have been converted to (SSGN) and launch standard cruise missiles.

- Los Angeles class (attack submarines: 18 in active service, 44 retired of 62 built)
- Seawolf class (attack submarines: 3 in active service of 3 planned)
- Virginia class (attack submarines: 21 in active service of 48 planned)
- Ohio class (ballistic missile submarines: 14 in active service of 24 planned)
  - (Ohio class converted to guided missile submarines: 4 in active service)

== Future requirements ==
In a 2012 study called the "Force Structure Assessment", the Navy determined a post-2020 battle-force requirement of 306 ships.

- 12 fleet ballistic missile submarines
- 11 nuclear-powered aircraft carriers
- 48 nuclear-powered attack submarines
- 0-4 nuclear-powered cruise missile submarines
- 88 large, multi-mission, surface combatants
- 52 small, multi-role, surface combatants
- 33 amphibious landing ships
- 29 combat logistics force ships
- 33 support vessels

== Historically significant vessels ==
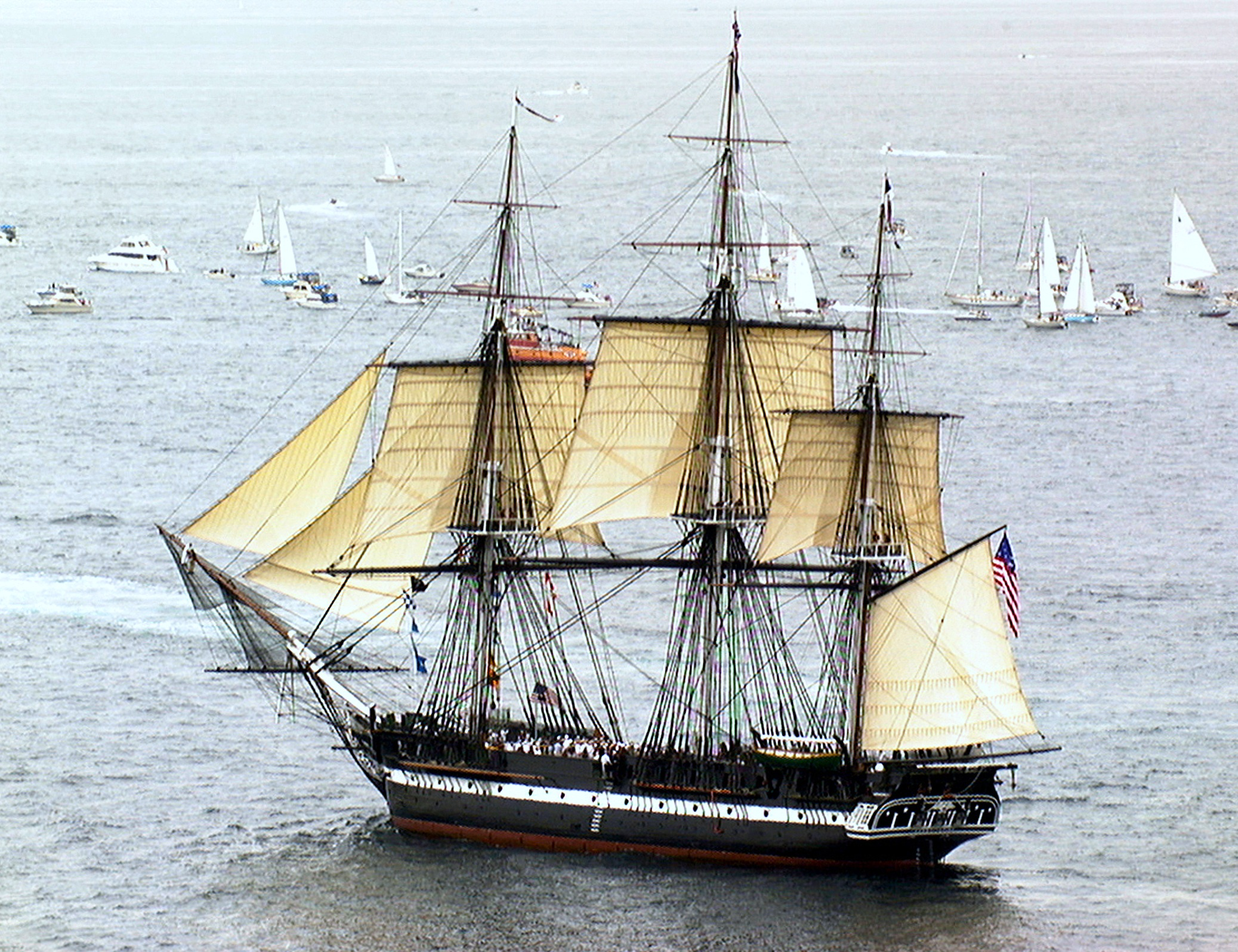
USS Constitution

The U.S. Navy has operated a number of vessels important to both United States and world naval history:

- USS Constitution, nicknamed "Old Ironsides", is the only surviving vessel of the original six frigates authorized by Congress in the Naval Act of 1794, which established the United States Navy. It served with distinction in the War of 1812, singlehandedly defeating a number of powerful enemy warships, and is currently docked in Charlestown, Massachusetts, as the oldest commissioned warship afloat.
- USS Bonhomme Richard (1765) was involved in the Battle of Flamborough Head on 23 September 1779, one of the most celebrated naval actions of the American War of Independence. This battle is famous in part for Bonhomme Richard's commander John Paul Jones, when called upon to surrender his sinking ship by the captain of the more heavily armed British frigate HMS Serapis by replying, "Sir, I have not yet begun to fight!", before defeating and capturing the Serapis.
- USS Philadelphia (1799) was a 36-gun sailing frigate that ran aground and was captured intact in Tripoli Harbor by Barbary corsairs during the First Barbary War. On the night of 16 February 1804, four months after the ship was turned against American ships, Lieutenant Stephen Decatur led a small detachment of U.S. Marines aboard a captured Tripolitan ketch close enough to board her. Decatur's men stormed the ship, overpowered the Tripolitan sailors, and set fire to Philadelphia. British Admiral Horatio Nelson is said to have called this "the most bold and daring act of the age."
- USS Chesapeake (1799) was a 38-gun sailing frigate, also one of the original six frigates. On 22 June 1807, she was fired upon by HMS Leopard of the Royal Navy for refusing to allow a search for deserters. The event, now known as the Chesapeake–Leopard affair, angered the American public and government and was a precipitating factor that led to the War of 1812, America's "second war of independence."
- USS Vincennes (1826) was the flagship of the South Sea Surveying and Exploring Expedition to the Antarctic region, and was the first U.S. Navy vessel to circumnavigate the globe (1836–1840), demonstrating the United States' growing global naval reach and scientific ambitions.
- USS Susquehanna (1850) was Commodore Matthew Perry's flagship when the threat of force by his fleet brought about the signing of the Convention of Kanagawa in 1854. This treaty played a leading role in the opening of Japan to the West and the creation of the Open Door Policy.
- USS Monitor and CSS Virginia are together known for participating in the first engagement between two steam-powered ironclads, known as the Battle of Hampton Roads, on 9 March 1862. Monitor was the first ironclad built by the U.S. Navy and its design introduced the rotating gun turret to naval warfare.
- USS Alligator (1862) was the first submarine built by the U.S. Navy. The submarine sank in 1863 while being towed during a storm and never saw combat. Though not a U.S. Navy vessel, the Confederate H. L. Hunley (from the same war and era) was the first successful combat submarine.
- USS Kearsarge (1861) and CSS Alabama fought a celebrated single-ship action known as the Battle of Cherbourg (1864) during the American Civil War on 19 June 1864, off Cherbourg, France.
- USS Maine (ACR-1) In January 1898, Maine was sent from Key West, Florida, to Havana, Cuba, to protect U.S. interests during a time of local insurrection and civil disturbances. Three weeks later, on 15 February at 9:40 p.m., an explosion on board the Maine occurred in the Havana Harbor. The explosion was a precipitating cause of the Spanish–American War that began in April 1898.
- USS Olympia (C-6) is a protected cruiser that became famous as the flagship of Commodore George Dewey at the victorious Battle of Manila Bay during the Spanish–American War in 1898, which lead directly to the United States annexing the Philippines from 1899 to 1946. Olympia has been preserved as a museum ship to the present day.
- USS Holland (SS-1) was the first submarine commissioned in the U.S. Navy.
- USS Connecticut (BB-18) was the lead ship of her class of six battleships. She served as flagship the Great White Fleet, the popular nickname for the U.S. Navy battle fleet that completed a circumnavigation of the globe from 16 December 1907 to 22 February 1909. This dramatic show of force was presented by order of U.S. president Theodore Roosevelt to demonstrate to the rest of the world America's military power and blue-water navy capability.
- USS South Carolina (BB-26) was the lead ship of her class, and, when commissioned in 1910, was the first American modern "dreadnought" battleship, a type of battleship armed with eight or more major caliber guns, pioneered by the British Royal Navy, which made all previous battleships obsolete.
- USS Texas (BB-35) is notable for being the first US battleship to become a permanent museum ship, the first battleship declared to be a US National Historic Landmark, the only remaining World War I–era dreadnought battleship, and the only remaining capital ship to have served in both World Wars.
- USS Langley (CV-1) was the United States Navy's first aircraft carrier, converted in 1920 from the collier USS Jupiter. She was also the U.S. Navy's first electrically propelled ship.
- USS Panay (PR-5) was a river gunboat that was sunk by Japanese aircraft on 12 December 1937 while she was anchored in the Yangtze River outside Nanking (now known as Nanjing), China. Japan and the United States were not at war at the time. The Japanese claimed that they did not see the American flags painted on the deck of the gunboat, apologized, and paid an indemnity. Nevertheless, the attack, and the subsequent Allison incident in Nanking, caused U.S. opinion to turn against the Japanese.
- USS Long Island (CVE-1) was commissioned on 2 June 1941 as the first of 122 escort carriers built by United States shipyards during World War II. Escort carriers were typically smaller, shorter, slower, cheaper, and more quickly built than fleet carriers, and also carried fewer planes. They however made huge contributions to winning the war through escorting convoys, providing air support to ground troops, transporting aircraft, and forming the core of hunter-killer groups which sought out and sank enemy submarines.
- USS Reuben James (DD-245) was a Clemson-class destroyer was torpedoed and sunk by a German submarine in a case of mistaken identity, during the period of neutrality five weeks before the attack on Pearl Harbor entered the United States into World War II. Many consider it the first United States Navy ship sunk by hostile action in the European theater of World War II. The ship's sinking provoked a furious outburst in the United States, especially when Germany refused to apologize, instead countering that the destroyer was operating in what Germany considered to be a war zone and had suffered the consequences
- USS Arizona (BB-39) was a Pennsylvania-class battleship, best known for her cataclysmic and dramatic sinking, with the loss of 1,177 lives, during the Japanese attack on Pearl Harbor on 7 December 1941, the event that brought about U.S. involvement in World War II. The USS Arizona Memorial is constructed over the shattered hull, which still contains the remains of most of the crew. It is commonly—but incorrectly—believed that Arizona remains perpetually in commission, likely because naval vessels entering Pearl Harbor render honors to the remains of the vessel.
- USS Utah (BB-31), a Florida-class battleship which primarily served during World War I and was notable for being sunk in the attack on Pearl Harbor. She was used to test various remote control equipment before being turned into a target ship for training Navy dive bombers. Supposedly mistaken by the Japanese for an active ship, she was sunk and attempts to right and refloat her failed. Alongside USS Arizona, she is the only other ship to remain in Pearl Harbor in the aftermath of the attack. She is also the state ship of Utah.
- USS Enterprise (CV-6), a Yorktown-class aircraft carrier, was the most engaged and decorated U.S. warship in World War II, involved in five of the six major carrier-versus-carrier battles of the Pacific Theater, as well as a host of minor engagements, and earning 20 of 22 possible battle stars. She was the only ship outside the British Royal Navy to earn the Admiralty Pennant, the highest award of the British, in the more than 400 years since its creation.
- USS Hornet (CV-8), a Yorktown-class aircraft carrier, was best known for launching the Doolittle Raid on Tokyo on 18 April 1942, as well as participating in the pivotal victory at the Battle of Midway.
- USS Gato (SS-212) was the lead ship of her highly successful class of submarine, which, along with the closely related Balao-class submarine and Tench-class submarine, eventually totaled 213 ships. These modern submarines were responsible for most of the destruction 55% of Japan's merchant marine that came about from American submarine attack during World War II. The war against shipping was the single most decisive factor in the collapse of the Japanese economy during the war. The Gato, Balao, and Tench classes also remained the backbone of American underwater fleet well past the ending of the war.
- USS LST-1 was the lead ship of the 1,051 Landing Ship, Tanks which the United States eventually built, which introduced a revolutionary capability: delivering tanks, trucks, and heavy equipment directly onto unimproved beaches. The LST became one of the central tools of Allied amphibious warfare, enabling operations from Normandy to the Pacific islands, and reshaping military logistics and expeditionary warfare.
- USS Juneau (CL-52) was an Atlanta-class light cruiser torpedoed and sunk by Japanese submarine I-26 at the Naval Battle of Guadalcanal 13 November 1942. A total 687 men, including, infamously, all five of the Sullivan brothers from Waterloo, Iowa, were killed in action as a result of its sinking.
- USS Washington (BB-56) was the only US battleship to sink an enemy battleship in direct combat, when she sank the Japanese battleship Kirishima in the Naval Battle of Guadalcanal, 13 November 1942.
- USS Essex (CV-9) was an aircraft carrier and the lead ship of the twenty four-ship Essex class. The Essex class was the 20th century's most numerous class of capital ships, was the backbone of the U.S. Navy's combat strength during World War II from mid-1943 on, and (along with the addition of the three Midway-class carriers just after the war) continued to be the heart of U.S. Naval strength until the 1960s and 1970s.
- USS Intrepid (CV-11), an Essex-class aircraft carrier, served in combat operations during World War 2 and the Vietnam War, as well as the recovery ship for the Mercury and a Gemini space missions. She is well-known as a popular museum ship, anchored off of Manhattan Island.
- USS Hornet (CV-12), also an Essex-class aircraft carrier, served in combat operations during World War 2 and the Vietnam War, as well as the recovery ship for the Apollo 11 and Apollo 12 space missions. She has been maintained as a museum ship, anchored off of Alameda Island in the San Francisco Bay.
- USS Mount McKinley (AGC-7) was the first ever dedicated amphibious command ship, providing landing commanders with sophisticated integrated communications, planning, and control during large-scale amphibious assaults, a concept that remains fundamental to the modern day.
- USS England (DE-635) was a Buckley-class destroyer escort that sank six Japanese submarines in twelve days during May 1944, a feat unparalleled in the history of antisubmarine warfare.
- USS Archerfish (SS-311) was a Balao-class submarine best known for torpedoing and sinking the 72,000-ton Japanese aircraft carrier Shinano, the largest warship ever sunk by a submarine, in November 1944.
- USS Batfish (SS-310), a Balao-class submarine that performed the amazing feat of sinking three Japanese submarines in a 76-hour period, in February 1945 during World War II.
- USS Indianapolis (CA-35), a Portland-class cruiser, delivered components of Little Boy, the first nuclear weapon used in combat, to the US Air Army Air Force base on Tinian island. Upon completion of this secret mission, it was sunk on 30 July 1945 by the Imperial Japanese Navy, leading to the worst loss of life at sea in U.S. Navy history. Approximately 300 sailors of the listed crew of 1,196 died in the attack itself, but of the 880 who survived after, only 316 men lived to be rescued. The men survived four days after suffering from a lack of food, dehydration, exposure, and shark attacks (as referenced in the movie Jaws).
- USS Missouri (BB-63), an Iowa-class battleship, was the site of the surrender of the Empire of Japan which ended World War II. She was also the last battleship built by the United States. In 1955, she was decommissioned and assigned to the inactive reserve fleet (the "Mothball Fleet"), but reactivated and modernized in 1984 as part of the 600-ship Navy plan, and fought in the 1991 Gulf War. Decommissioned in 1995, she was the last actively serving battleship in the world. She was donated to the USS Missouri Memorial Association in 1998 and became a museum ship at Pearl Harbor, moored facing USS Arizona.
- USS Midway (CV-41), commissioned just after World War II, was the first prototype of the massive American supercarriers, projecting American naval power across the globe for nearly half a century. She bridged eras, playing key roles from the Korean war-era, the Vietnam war, and as Persian Gulf flagship during Operation Desert Storm. She is also famous for being maintained as a popular museum ship in San Diego harbor.
- USS Nautilus (SSN-571), a submarine commissioned in 1954, was the world's first nuclear-powered ship. It demonstrated its capabilities by traveling 62,562 miles (100,684 km), more than half of which was submerged, in two years before having to refuel while breaking the record for longest submerged voyage, as well as being the first submarine to transit submerged under the North Pole in 1958.
- USS Skate (SSN-578), a nuclear-powered submarine commissioned in 1957, was the first ship to physically reach the North Pole when she surfaced there in 1958.
- USS Triton (SSRN-586), a nuclear-powered submarine commissioned in 1959, made the first submerged circumnavigation of the world during its shakedown cruise in 1960, as well as being the only non-Soviet submarine to be powered by two nuclear reactors.
- USS Thresher (SSN-593), the lead ship of her class of nuclear-powered attack submarines and was lost by accident on 10 April 1963.
- USS George Washington (SSBN-598), commissioned in 1959, was the first ever ballistic missile submarine.
- USS Long Beach (CGN-9) was the first nuclear-powered surface warship in the world when she was commissioned in 1961 and signalled a new era of United States naval weaponry by being the first large ship in the Navy to have guided missiles as its main battery.
- USS Enterprise (CVN-65) was the world's first nuclear-powered aircraft carrier when she was commissioned in 1961.
- USS Maddox (DD-731) was an Allen M. Sumner-class destroyer that was involved in a skirmish with North Vietnamese torpedo boats on 2 August 1964, known as the Gulf of Tonkin incident, which served as President Lyndon B. Johnson's legal justification for deploying U.S. conventional forces in Vietnam and for the commencement of open warfare against North Vietnam.
- USS Liberty (AGTR-5) was an intelligence gathering ship involved in an international incident when attacked by Israeli jet fighter planes and motor torpedo boats on 8 June 1967, during the Six-Day War and while in international waters off the Sinai Peninsula.
- USS Pueblo (AGER-2) was an intelligence gathering vessel involved in an international incident when boarded and seized by the Democratic People's Republic of Korea (North Korea) on 23 January 1968. The ship is still under Korean control, and remains in commission to this day.
- USS Nimitz (CVN-68) is lead ship of her class of ten nuclear-powered supercarriers. Since Nimitz was commissioned on 3 May 1975, these ships have been the centerpiece of American naval power. They are also largest warships ever built, although they are being eclipsed by the upcoming Gerald R. Ford-class aircraft carriers.
- USS Phoenix (CL-46) was a Brooklyn-class light cruiser, present during the Japanese attack on Pearl Harbor and earning nine battle stars for World War II service. Transferred to the Argentine Navy in 1951, she was ultimately renamed ARA General Belgrano in 1956. She was torpedoed and sunk during the Falklands War on 2 May 1982 by the British nuclear-powered submarine HMS Conqueror, with the loss of 323 lives, or just over half of Argentine deaths in the war. The sinking of General Belgrano was controversial in both Britain and Argentina at the time, and for some, remains so to this day.
- USS Stark (FFG-31) was struck on 17 May 1987 by two Exocet antiship missiles fired from an Iraqi Mirage F1 fighter during the Iran–Iraq War becoming the victim of the only successful anti-ship missile attack on a U.S. Navy warship.
- USS Samuel B. Roberts (FFG-58) is an Oliver Hazard Perry-class frigate which struck an Iranian mine on 14 April 1988, severely damaging, and nearly sinking her, resulting in ten injured sailors, but no fatalities. The ship suffered flooding, fires, and a broken keel, which normally is fatal to the ship, but damage control efforts saved the ship. The attack resulted in the launching of Operation Praying Mantis. The ship was repaired and continued active service until it was decommissioned on 22 May 2015.
- USS Vincennes (CG-49) is a Ticonderoga-class AEGIS equipped guided missile cruiser. On 3 July 1988, the ship shot down Iran Air Flight 655 over the Persian Gulf, killing all 290 civilian passengers on board, including 38 non-Iranians and 66 children.
- USS Cole (DDG-67) On 12 October 2000, while at anchor in Aden, Yemen, Cole was attacked by Al-Qaeda suicide bombers, who sailed a small boat near the destroyer and detonated explosive charges. The blast created a hole in the port side of the ship about 40 feet (12 m) in diameter, killing 17 crew members and injuring 39.
- USS Greeneville (SSN-772) is a Los Angeles-class submarine that, on 9 February 2001, precipitated international controversy when she struck the Japanese fishery high school training ship Ehime Maru (えひめ丸) off the coast of Oahu, causing the fishing boat to sink in less than ten minutes with the death of nine crew members. The Greeneville was conducting a practice emergency main ballast tank blow as a demonstration to civilian visitors.
- USS Bainbridge (DDG-96) and USS Halyburton (FFG-40) played the central naval role in the 2009 rescue of Captain Richard Phillips from Somali pirates, the most well known of modern maritime security operations.
- USS Zumwalt (DDG-1000) the lead ship in a class that has been the most radical surface combatant design in decades. She pioneered technologies influencing future warship design, despite the class being truncated.
- USS Carl Vinson (CVN-70), the third Nimitz-class supercarrier has exemplified the modern nuclear-powered aircraft carrier as the centerpiece of American global military power. She became historically symbolic as the ship from which Osama bin Laden's body was buried at sea after a 2011 raid, linking her to one of the defining events of the post-9/11 era.

== See also ==
- List of United States Navy ships
- Equipment of the United States Navy
- List of current ships of the United States Navy
- List of currently active United States military watercraft
- List of United States Navy amphibious warfare ships
- List of submarine classes in service
- List of naval ship classes in service
- List of auxiliary ship classes in service
- List of Military Sealift Command ships
- United States ship naming conventions
- Glossary of watercraft types in service of the United States
