= USS Sidney C. Jones =

Gunboat of the United States Navy

History

United States
- Name: Sidney C. Jones
- Builder: G. E. and W. H. Goodspeed, East Haddam, Connecticut
- Launched: April 1856
- Acquired: October 7, 1861
- Commissioned: January 29, 1862
- Out of service: July 15, 1862
- Fate: Scuttled, July 15, 1862

General characteristics
- Type: Mortar schooner
- Tonnage: 254 tons
- Length: 98 feet (30 m)
- Beam: 27 feet (8.2 m)
- Propulsion: Sails
- Complement: 36
- Armament: 1 × 13 in (330 mm) mortar; 2 × 32-pounder guns; 2 × 12-pounder smoothbore guns

USS Sidney C. Jones was a schooner that served in the Union Navy during the American Civil War. Built in East Haddam, Connecticut, and launched in April 1856, Sidney C. Jones was intended to be used on trade routes. In October 1861, she was purchased by the Union Navy for military service. Originally intended for service on the Union blockade, she was later converted into a mortar schooner and was armed with a mortar and four other cannons. In April 1862, she participated in the bombardment of Confederate positions at Fort Jackson and Fort St. Philip. During July, she ran aground while part of a force bombarding Vicksburg, Mississippi, and was blown up by her crew to prevent capture on July 15.

== Construction and characteristics ==
Sidney C. Jones was built at East Haddam, Connecticut, in 1856, at the shipbuilding yard of G. E. and W. H. Goodspeed. She was launched in April of that year. A sailing ship, she was a schooner with a wooden hull. Sidney C. Jones was 98 feet (30 m) long, and had a beam of 27 feet (8.2 m). Naval historian W. Craig Gaines reports that she had a draft of 7 feet 8 inches (2.34 m), while American Civil War military records indicate that this figure represents depth of hold. Her tonnage was 254 tons. She was manned by a crew of 36. After her launch, she was intended to be run on trade routes between Hartford, Connecticut, and Philadelphia, Pennsylvania.

== Civil War operations ==
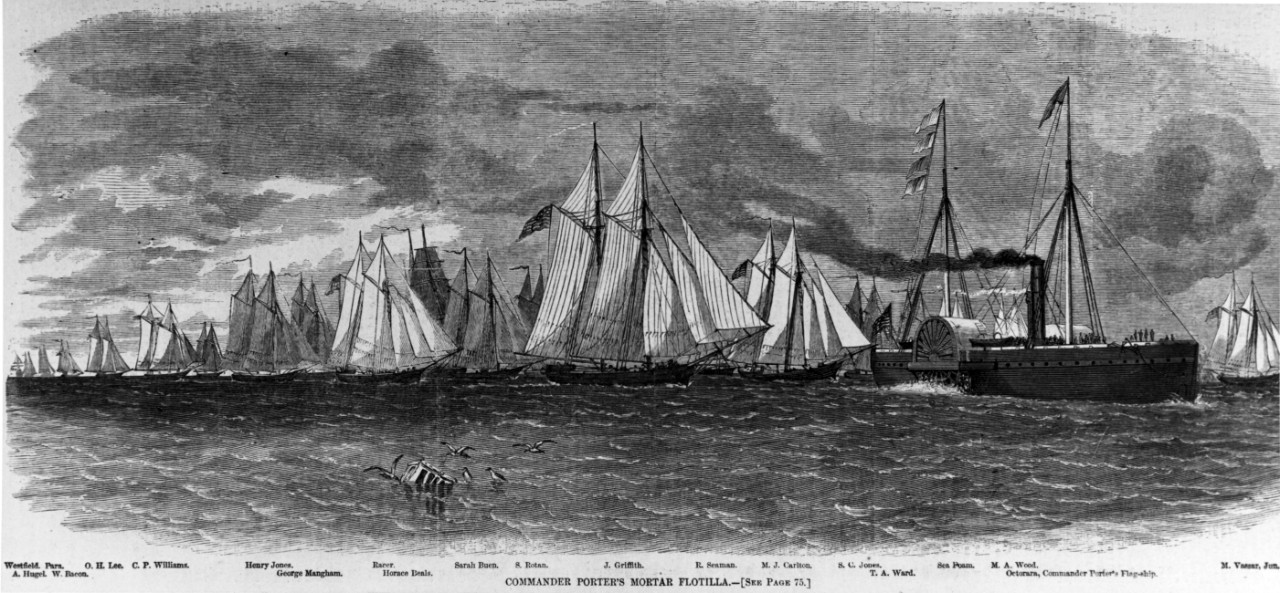
The Union mortar vessels in the New Orleans campaign. Sidney C. Jones is in the background and is mostly hidden.

On October 7, 1861, the Union Navy purchased Sidney C. Jones for military service in the American Civil War from George E. Goodspeed at a cost of $10,500 at New York City. The Union Navy originally intended to use her in the blockade, and by November 9, 1861, she had been armed with two 32-pounder cannon, each of which weighed 57 hundredweight. It was later decided to instead convert her into a mortar schooner and assign her to the fleet of Flag Officer David Glasgow Farragut. A 13-inch (33 cm) mortar was then added to Sidney C. Jones's armament. She was commissioned on January 29, 1862, at the New York Navy Yard, under the command of Acting Master Robert Adams. By February, in addition to the mortar and the 32-pounders, two 12-pounder smoothbore cannon had been added to her armament.

Farragut was preparing for a campaign against New Orleans, Louisiana, and Sidney C. Jones was order to sail to the Gulf of Mexico; she reached Ship Island in early March, later entering the Mississippi River on March 18 via Pass A L'Outre. Sidney C. Jones was part of Commander David Dixon Porter's Mortar Flotilla. On April 18, Porter's mortar schooners moved upriver towards the Confederate positions at Fort Jackson and Fort St. Philip, with their masts camouflaged with brush. Porter divided his command into three parts; Sidney C. Jones was assigned to the rearmost one, Lieutenant Walter W. Queen's Second Division, along with five other vessels. This division was assigned a location with a clear view of both forts, and of the three parts was the most exposed to Confederate fire. At a range of a minimum of 3,680 yards (3,360 m), each schooner fired a mortar shot at the Confederate forts every ten minutes, in the beginning of the Battle of Forts Jackson and St. Philip. One of the ships in Sidney C. Jones's division, USS Maria J. Carlton, was sunk by Confederate fire on the morning of April 19, and Porter ordered the division to move to a more sheltered position. The firing increased in intensity on April 20. During the firing, Sidney C. Jones was commanded by Acting Master J. Duncan Graham.

The bombardment continued through the night of April 24, when Farragut ran his ships past the Confederate forts. In order to pre-occupy the Confederate defenders, the mortar vessels increased their rates of fire until the Union ships had passed the positions. New Orleans surrendered to Union forces on April 29, four days after Farragut's vessels reached the city, and Forts Jackson and St. Philip surrendered on April 28. Sidney C. Jones' assignment to the operations in the New Orleans region ended on April 28. Porter's ships were sent to blockade off of Mobile, Alabama, but were returned to the Mississippi River in June for the naval operations against Vicksburg, Mississippi. In late June and early July, Sidney C. Jones participated in the bombardment of Vicksburg, including shelling the city on June 28, while Farragut ran vessels past the Confederate position. On July 15, the Confederate ironclad CSS Arkansas made a run through Farragut's fleet to Vicksburg. Sidney C. Jones had run aground several days before, as she had gone ashore and was then stranded by lowering river levels. To prevent potential capture of the vessel during Arkansas's run, she was blown up by her crew that day. At the time of her sinking, she was commanded by an Acting Master Jack. During her time in Union service, Sidney C. Jones required $21,352.82 of repair costs.

== Sources ==
- Chatelain, Neil P. (2020). Defending the Arteries of Rebellion: Confederate Naval Operations in the Mississippi River Valley, 1861–1865. El Dorado Hills, California: Savas Beatie. ISBN 978-1-61121-510-6.
- Gaines, W. Craig (2008). Encyclopedia of Civil War Shipwrecks. Baton Rouge, Louisiana: Louisiana State University Press. ISBN 978-0-8071-3274-6.
- Hearn, Chester G. (1995). The Capture of New Orleans 1862. Baton Rouge, Louisiana: Louisiana State University Press. ISBN 0-8071-1945-8.
- Kennedy, Frances H., ed. (1998). The Civil War Battlefield Guide (2nd ed.). Boston/New York: Houghton Mifflin. ISBN 978-0-395-74012-5.
- Official Records of the Union and Confederate Navies in the War of the Rebellion, Series 1. U. S. Naval War Records Office. Office memoranda. Vol. 18. Washington, D.C.: Government Printing Office. 1904.
- Official Records of the Union and Confederate Navies in the War of the Rebellion, Series 1. U. S. Naval War Records Office. Office memoranda. Vol. 19. Washington, D.C.: Government Printing Office. 1905.
- Official Records of the Union and Confederate Navies in the War of the Rebellion, Series 2. U. S. Naval War Records Office. Office memoranda. Vol. 1. Washington, D.C.: Government Printing Office. 1921.
- Silverstone, Paul H. (1989). Warships of the Civil War Navies. Annapolis, Maryland: Naval Institute Press. ISBN 0-87021-783-6.
