= Glossary of watercraft types in service of the United States =

This glossary defines the various types of ships and accessory watercraft that have been used in service of the United States. Such service is mainly defined as military vessels used in the United States Navy and United States Coast Guard, as well as the defunct, incorporated, or renamed institutions such as the United States Revenue Cutter Service. Service of the United States can also be defined in this context as special government missions in the form of expeditions, such as the Wilkes Expedition or the North Pacific Exploring and Surveying Expedition. The scope of the glossary encompasses both the "Old Navy" of the United States (sail or later steam vessels, with ship type named for the rigging or propulsion method [ex. steamer, cutter, schooner]), from its beginnings as the "Continental Navy", through the "New Navy" (revolutionary steam or fueled vessels, with naming derived from a hull classification scheme) and up to modern day. The watercraft included in the glossary are derived from United States ships with logbooks published by the National Archives and Records Administration.

== A ==
=== Ammunition ship ===
A type of auxiliary ship specifically designed to store and transport ordinances or ammunition to combat ships.

=== Armed merchantman ===
A merchant or civilian vessel armed for military purposes, like water defense or raiding. May also be generally referred to as a "merchant raider".

=== Armed stores ship ===
See "combat stores ship".

=== Armed yacht ===
A yacht that was armed with weapons for naval service. Originally applied to small, fast and agile naval vessels, typically privately owned and expropriated or purchased for government use in times of war, most famously in World War II.

=== Armored cruiser ===
A type of warship of the late 19th and early 20th centuries. It was designed to operate as a long-range, independent warship, with exceptional speed and large guns. Has protective metal plating on the decking as well as the sides of the hull.

=== Attack transport ===
An amphibious assault vessel that carries troops and their equipment (arms and landing crafts) in an invasion force. See "Troopship".

=== Auxiliary cruiser ===
A more modern (late 19th Century and onwards) name for a Navy armed merchantman, a merchant or civilian vessel armed for military purposes. Armed merchantmen of the World Wars would be classified as auxiliary cruisers as the standard term.

=== Auxiliary floating drydock ===
A large portable dry dock vessel that can submerge and raise out of water in order to provide mobile repair under the water line.

=== Auxiliary ship ===
A naval vessel, such as a tanker or supply ship, designed to operate in support of combatant ships and other naval operations. May also be referred to in a more specific ship type, such as an "auxiliary steamer".

=== Auxiliary steamer ===
An auxiliary ship powered by steam propulsion. See "Auxiliary ship".

== B ==
=== Bark ===
A sailing vessel with three or more masts, fore-and-aft rigged on only the aftermost / mizzen mast. The other masts are square-rigged. Also spelled "barque", or "barc".

=== Barkentine ===
A sailing vessel with three or more masts, square-rigged on the foremast, while fore-and-aft rigged on the remaining masts. Also spelled "barquentine".

=== Barracks ship ===
An unpropelled vessel used as temporary housing for sailors.

=== Barrier Boat ===
A small tug built to deploy and maintain port security booms surrounding Navy ships and installations in port.

=== Battleship ===
A large, heavily armored and heavily gunned powered warship, relatively slower than other naval craft due to its armaments.

=== Blockade runner ===
A merchant vessel intended to evade a blockade. Examples in American history can be seen in the Confederate States of America using blockade runners to continue commercial trade abroad and move goods to support the war effort.

=== Bomb brig ===
A type of bomb vessel, which is a wooden sailing naval ship constructed as a brig (two square-rigged masts). The primary armaments were mortars mounted near the bow and elevated to a high angle, projecting their fire in a ballistic arc.

=== Brig ===
A sailing vessel characterized by two square-rigged masts.

=== Brigantine ===
A two-masted sailing vessel composed of a full square-rigged foremast, and fore-and-aft rigging on the mainmast. Can be further classified by specific setup, like a "hermaphrodite brig".

=== Broadside ironclad ===
Earliest form of ironclad warship, with iron armor over the wooden hull and the weapons aligned on the sides of the ship.

=== Buoy tender ===
See "Lighthouse tender".

== C ==
=== Canal boat ===
A type of barge watercraft, thin and narrow with a shallow draft, suited to canals and other like waterways for transporting cargo and personnel.

=== Cargo ship ===
A merchant vessel that carries goods and materials between ports. May also be referred to by the more general term, a freighter.

=== Casemate ironclad ===
A type of iron-armored gunboat briefly used in the American Civil War. They had a single sloped (casemate) structure on the main deck housing the entire gun battery, effective at deflecting cannon shot.

=== Clipper ===
A mid-nineteenth century merchant vessel which was lightweight and designed for speed. Name derived from the Baltimore Clipper.

=== Coal barge ===
A large, flat-bottomed vessel used in calm and interior waterways to transport coal.

=== Collier ===
A bulk cargo ship used to transport coal.

=== Combat stores ship ===
A vessel used to stow and carry supplies and other goods for naval purposes. Also referred to simply as a "storeship", or an "armed stores ship".

=== Corvette ===
Traditionally the smallest class of vessel considered to be a proper (or “rated”) warship, with guns organized on a single deck. Past the age of sail, corvettes, sloops, and frigates were grouped together under the term "cruiser".

=== Cottonclad ram ===
See "Cottonclad warship".

=== Cottonclad warship ===
A type of steam-powered warship, used in the American Civil War, in which a wooden ship was protected by a thick lining of cotton bales and was equipped with a ram. The bales also provided breastworks lining the deck for Confederate sailors. Also referred to as a "cottonclad ram".

=== Cruiser ===
A type of warship intended for high speed battle capability and cruising distant waters. Can be used to encompass the terms "frigate" and "sloop" in the transition from sail to steam and fuel power.

=== Cutter ===
In the age of sail, a ship with one mast and two headsails, fast and with a shallow draft. The term may also encompass any ship in a cutter institution, like the United States Revenue Cutter Service. Mainly completes coastal guarding, survey, and convoy escort duties. Other classes utilized for long-cruises and light ice-breaking, like the Tallapoosa-class cutter. Also used in 20th Century as turbine-electric-driven sloops, such as those loaned to the United Kingdom during WWII as "Banff-class sloops".

== D ==
=== Depot ship ===
A type of auxiliary ship used for supplying and repairing small naval groups that can also be used as a floating base of operation.

=== Destroyer ===
A warship designed to be fast, maneuverable, long-endurance and intended to escort larger vessels. Takes action to defend battleships and similar vessels against short range attackers, or to act as advanced scouts.

=== Destroyer tender ===
A type of ship's tender or auxiliary ship intended to provide maintenance, logistics, and repair for destroyers while moored or anchored.

=== Dispatch boat ===
A boat which carried messages, or mail (dispatches) between high-ranking military officials aboard other ships or to land-based destinations.

=== Distilling ship ===
A class of energy-intensive military ships, generally converted tankers, with the capability to convert salt water into fresh water.

=== Double-ender ===
A ship where the bow and stern are similarly constructed to look the same.

=== Dreadnought ===
An early form of battleships, popular in the early 1900s and World War One, based on the revolutionary ship HMS Dreadnought. Heavily equipped with at least ten high-caliber twelve-inch guns and steam propulsion systems.

=== Drone aircraft catapult control ship ===
A type of aircraft catapult designed after World War Two to specialize in the launch and recovery of early drone aircraft at sea.

== E ==
=== Extreme clipper ===
A type of clipper designed to sacrifice cargo for speed, on an already fast ship design.

== F ==
=== Ferryboat ===
A merchant vessel used to carry people, vehicles, and goods across a water.

=== Flagship ===
A vessel that carries the commanding officer of a fleet, and thus flies the commanding officer's flag.

=== Fleet replenishment oiler ===
A large cargo vessel with dry cargo holds and large fuel tanks used to restock ships in the rest of the fleet while at sea.

=== Frigate ===
A warship that has had been designed for speed and maneuverability, ideal for patrolling, lookout, and escort duties, with fully armed spar deck. Defined in the sailing era as a three-masted vessel with all square rigs. Modern frigates, usually called cruisers, are a class of medium-speed anti-submarine vessels.

== G ==
=== Guard ship ===
A warship assigned as a stationary guard in a port or harbor, maintaining a higher degree of action readiness. This is as opposed to a coastal patrol boat, which serves its protective role at sea.

=== Gunboat ===
A smaller naval warship designed to attack coastal targets, armed with one or more large naval guns. Other classes of gunboats are adapted to patrol interior waterways and to enforce the blockade, like the Unadilla-class gunboat of the American Civil War.

== H ==
=== Heavy cruiser ===
A medium sized warship, protected and armored as a cruiser, with large eight-inch guns or higher. Intended for long range and high speed objectives.

=== Heavy frigate ===
A type of frigate armed with over two-dozen eighteen-pounder cannons.

=== Hospital ship ===
A ship, designated or converted in emergency situations, to primarily function as a floating medical treatment facility or hospital. They have been used as field hospitals during times of war, or emergency hospitals in times of peace.

== I ==
=== Icebreaker ===
A type of auxiliary steamship of many forms (ex: gunboat) designed to plow through icy waters in the Arctic or Antarctic, able to clear the way for other ships for voyages (like research or cargo transport).

=== Ironclad gunboat ===
A type of ironclad warship that is converted from or takes the specific configuration of a gunboat.

=== Ironclad warship ===
A steam-propelled warship, armed with massive guns, and armored with iron and steel plates over a wooden hull ship or gunboat. Constructed from 1859 to the early 1890s, ironclad warships supplanted the wooden vessels as the most powerful warship on the coast and rivers, seen in the American Civil War with the U.S.S. Monitor and the C.S.S. Virginia. May also be referred to simply as an "ironclad".

== K ==
=== Ketch ===
A small sailing vessel with two masts (usually fore-and-aft rigged) and a square stern.

== L ==
=== Light aircraft carrier ===
An aircraft carrier smaller in capacity than full sized variants, used in World War II to fill a gap fleet allotments for carriers because they could be produced quicker and cheaper. Later converted into antisubmarine carriers and amphibious assault support.

=== Light cruiser ===
A smaller to medium-sized warship, protected and armored like a cruiser, but with six-inch guns or below.

=== Light-draft gunboat ===
A smaller type of gunboat, usually lightly armored, and specialized for rivers due to its low water displacement. Name may vary; draft may be replaced with "draught".

=== Light-draft monitor ===
A type of monitor that had a lighter armor for a lighter draft sitting in water, like the Casco-class named after the U.S.S. Casco. Name may vary; draft may be replaced with "draught".

=== Lighthouse tender ===
A ship specifically designed to support and maintain lighthouses or lightvessels by providing supplies, fuel, mail, and transportation. Accessory tasks include search and rescue, and law enforcement aid. May also be referred to as "buoy tender".

== M ==
=== Merchant raider ===
See "Armed merchantman".

=== Minesweeper ===
Vessels outfitted with special equipment to detect and clear naval mines. Popular in World War Two for use in coastal areas (for landings) and shipping lanes.

=== Monitor ===
A type of small, heavily armed (single or multiple turrets), and superior armored warship, designed for shallow waters such as coastal areas (similar to the river monitors). The first successful ironclad monitor lent the name of the warship type, the U.S.S. Monitor. Specific monitors like the Passaic-class, named after the U.S.S. Passaic, were larger with thicker hull plating, larger guns, better steering, and an improved pilot house design.

=== Mortar gunboat ===
A type of gunboat commissioned during the American Civil War, outfitted with 13-inch mortars and firing platforms to bombard fortifications from the water.

=== Mortar schooner ===
A type of schooner commissioned during the American Civil War, outfitted with 13-inch mortars and firing platforms to bombard fortifications from the water.

=== Motorboat ===
Any watercraft powered by a motor, usually referring more specifically to a boat transporting officers.

== N ==
=== Naval trawler ===
A fishing trawler converted for naval military purposes, armed and reinforced with steel hulls and armor. Popular during the World Wars as emergency use ships for duties like anti-submarine warfare.

== P ==
=== Paddle steamer ===
A type of steamship that drives paddle wheels to propel the craft through the water.

=== Passenger ship ===
Any merchant ship whose primary function is to carry passengers at sea. According to international maritime, a passenger ship carries at least 12 people.

=== Patrol boat ===
A relatively small naval vessel intended for defensive purposes. Different classes of patrol boats have characteristics for specialized purposes such as coastal defense, border protection, anti-submarine warfare, immigration law-enforcement, ice breaking, and search and rescue duties.

=== Patrol gunboat ===
A patrol boat built in the configuration and size of a gunboat.

=== Picket boat ===
A small type of naval craft used for harbor patrol and other inshore work, like sentry or warning duties.

=== Pilot boat ===
A vessel used to transport naval personnel (such as helmsmen) from harbors to another vessel in need of a pilot.

=== Powder tugboat ===
A type of tugboat equipped to transport powder reserves. See U.S.S. Port Fire and U.S.S. Blue Light.

=== Pre-dreadnought battleship ===
A type of battleship popular before the revolutionary battleship, HMS Dreadnought. Carried guns of varying sizes wherever the guns would fit on the deck, with emphasis on smaller caliber guns for close range combat.

=== Prison ship ===
A vessel that has been converted to serve as a detention for excess prisoners, usually prisoners-of-war in times of conflict.

=== Protected cruiser ===
A type of naval cruiser of the late nineteenth century with an armored deck that protects machines from shrapnel.

== R ==
=== Ram ===
A type of warship outfitted with a naval ram on the bow, reinforced and possibly metal-plated as the principal weapon of the ship.

=== Receiving ship ===
A type of hulk used in harbors, usually obsolete or unseaworthy, meant to house newly recruited sailors or transfers before assignment to a ship's crew or station.

=== Reconnaissance vessel ===
See "Spy ship".

=== Repair ship ===
A naval auxiliary ship designed to act as a mobile base to provide maintenance support and repairs to warships during times of conflict, and to act as a training station for emergency mechanical situations in times of peace.

=== Research vessel ===
A ship specially equipped to carry out sea research and voyages of exploration, usually with fitting and instrumentation customized to the mission at hand.

=== Revenue cutter ===
A cutter specifically used for customs and naval law enforcement purposes, designed for speed as with any cutter.

=== River gunboat ===
A type of gunboat specially suited for use in rivers, with a shallow draft (6 feet or less) and up to three rudders for swift currents.

=== River monitor ===
A type of ironclad monitor designed to patrol rivers, heavily armed and with a very shallow draft.

== S ==
=== Sailing ship ===
Any naval vessel whose power is derived from sail and wind, provided that any propelling mechanisms (if equipped) are not being used.

=== Schooner ===
A fore and aft-rigged sailing vessel with two or more masts of which the foremast is shorter than the main.

=== Scout cruiser ===
A type of cruiser that is smaller, and thus faster. These ships are for reconnaissance more so than fighting, and are thus more lightly armed and with a better range than protected cruisers or light cruisers.

=== Screw corvette ===
A version of a corvette ship that is driven by a screw propulsion system, made popular during WWII for being long-range and nearly as fast as a U-boat in the Battle of the Atlantic.

=== Screw frigate ===
See "Steam frigate".

=== Screw gunboat ===
A gunboat that utilizes a screw-propulsion system. See "Gunboat".

=== Screw sloop ===
A type of sloop-of-war, driven by a screw-propulsion system, designed with a single gun deck that carried up to eighteen guns and used for combat (for example, the U.S.S. Hartford).

=== Screw steamer ===
A steamship using a steam engine to power a screw-propulsion system. May be designed with multiple screws, to create a twin-screw steamer and up.

=== Screw tugboat ===
A tugboat that utilizes a screw-propulsion system. See "Tugboat".

=== Seaplane tender ===
Vessel that supports seaplanes, which are aircraft designed to land and take off from water. May also be referred to as a "seaplane carrier", if the tender had repair facilities (which later became the massive aircraft carriers).

=== Shallow-draft gunboat ===
See "Light-draft gunboat".

=== Ship of the line ===
A large warship with square rigging and at least two gundecks. Ship was designed for the naval tactic known as the line of battle.

=== Ship's tender ===
A small vessel, or alternatively a large vessel operating without the small vessel, that tends to the needs of other ships, providing supplies and transporting personnel. Also simply referred to as a "tender".

=== Sidewheel steamer ===
A type of paddle steamer that is characterized by paddles on the sides of the vessel. The paddles, driven by a steam engine, may be the main source of power, or assisting a sailing rig. Can sometimes move the paddles at different speeds and in opposite directions, increasing maneuverability.

=== Sixth-rate ===
A smaller sailing warship from the Royal Navy of the United Kingdom holding under 28 guns. A more specific sixth-rate, a post ship, was to be commanded by a post captain, while others were commanded by officers of different pedigree. The U.S.S. Cyane, captured during the War of 1812, was taken as a prize ship and incorporated into United States Naval Service as a Banterer-class, after HMS Banterer.

=== Sloop ===
A sailboat with a single mast, in a fore-and-aft configuration. Easy to maneuver, these ships typically have only one headsail in front of the mast and one mainsail behind the mast.

=== Sloop-of-war ===
A type of warship, similar to a frigate, with a single gun deck that carried ten to eighteen guns that excelled at close combat.

=== Spy ship ===
A vessel, usually equipped with special surveillance equipment, used on covert duty to observe and assess enemies from the sea.

=== Station ship ===
A vessel assigned to a particular station or geographic region. Duties may include patrolling, troop movement, refueling, repair, etc. intended for upkeep of the station or region.

=== Steamer ===
See "Steamship"

=== Steamship ===
Any vessel that uses steam to power an engine, which in turn operates propellers or paddlewheels. Also commonly referred to as a "steamer".

=== Steam cutter ===
A cutter powered by steam propulsion. See "Cutter".

=== Steam frigate ===
A steam-powered warship, possibly equipped with a screw propeller that was not designed to stand in the line of battle, but serve accessory roles like flagship duties. May also be referred to as a more specific "screw frigate".

=== Steam gunboat ===
A gunboat powered by steam propulsion. See "Gunboat".

=== Steam sloop ===
A sloop powered by steam propulsion. See "Sloop" for configuration or "Steam frigate" for near-exact ship.

=== Steam tanker ===
A tanker powered by steam propulsion. See "Tanker".

=== Steam tugboat ===
A tugboat that is powered by steam propulsion. See "Tugboat".

=== Steam yacht ===
A yacht powered by steam propulsion. See "Armed yacht."

=== Sternwheel steamer ===
See "Sternwheeler".

=== Sternwheeler ===
A type of paddle steamer that is propelled by a paddle wheel on the stern of the boat (as opposed to a sidewheel steamer). May also be referred to as a sternwheel steamer.

=== Stone ship ===
Any ship that was a member of the stone fleet during the American Civil War. The old sunken ships were loaded with stone, and used by the Union Navy to obstruct blockade runners.

=== Storeship ===
See "Combat stores ship".

=== Submarine tender ===
A vessel that provides logistic support and maintenance for deployed submarines.

=== Super-dreadnought ===
A dreadnought battleship that is armed with larger guns (13.5").

=== Supply ship ===
Any ship that takes stores, ammunition, etc. from storeships or ports and distributes the materials among a fleet. Can be more specifically classified as an auxiliary ship, replenishment oiler, etc.

=== Survey vessel ===
A ship specifically designed for hydrographic survey and mapping, with specialized tools to measure location and data. Typically conducted by federal services like NOAA.

== T ==
=== Tanker ===
A ship designed to store and transfer liquefied or gaseous goods.

=== Tender ===
See "Ship's tender".

=== Tinclad ===
Converted steamer riverboats with very light armor plating, intended to be quick and have the shallowest draft possible. Protected sailors and ships from riverside snipers. Flagship of the tinclads is considered the U.S.S. Rattler.

=== Timberclad warship ===
A type of river gunboat, similar to an ironclad, but had timber armor instead. Used to transport troops and supplies on the Mississippi River during the Civil War.

=== Topsail schooner ===
A type of schooner with two masts. The foremast has square rigging on the topsails.

=== Torpedo boat ===
A small and fast vessel designed to carry torpedoes, to harass enemy supply lines and sneakily attack advance ships.

=== Torpedo boat tender ===
A type of ship's tender specifically designed to maintain, repair, and supply deployed torpedo boats. May be equipped with a crane to handle the torpedo boat.

=== Training ship ===
A warship that carries at least one naval officer and a crew of naval apprentices or officers-in-training while going on training cruises.

=== Troop transport ===
See "Troopship".

=== Troopship ===
A specific type of transport ship that primarily transports military personnel and equipment. May be further specified to its specific intended purpose, like an "attack transport".

=== Tugboat ===
A vessel that moves other ships in mooring and berthing. A tug assists by pushing or pulling ships that cannot move themselves, or are in too difficult a situation to do so alone without an escort. If equipped with steam propulsion, may be referred to specifically as a "steam tug", or any tugboat may be referred to simply as a "tug".

=== Twin-screw steamer ===
A screw steamship with two screw propulsion systems. See "Screw steamer".

== U ==
=== Unprotected cruiser ===
A type of cruiser in use during the pre-dreadnought era (about 1880 to 1905) that lacked the same level of armor plating as protected cruisers, but were also lighter and cheaper to produce.

== W ==
=== Warship ===
Any vessel designed to engage in naval warfare, meaning the ship has characteristics to withstand damage, carry sailors and guns, and be faster and more maneuverable than expected of merchant ships.

=== Water barge ===
A large, flat-bottomed vessel used to transport different types of cargo in waterways with a shallow draught, like interior rivers.

=== Whaler ===
Any vessel that was designed or adapted for whaling (from hunting to processing the carcass), ranging in size from schooners to full ships. May be used in times of war for minesweeping or anti-submarine warfare.

== See also ==
- List of ship types
- List of types of naval vessels
- Glossary of nautical terms (disambiguation)
- Hull classification symbol
- List of auxiliaries of the United States Navy
- List of hull classifications
- United States Navy ships

== Notes ==
1.The logbooks of the United States ships in question are found across multiple record groups and series in the National Archives and Records Administration catalog of holdings. The vast majority of ships and types can be found in: RG24 "Logbooks of U.S. Navy Ships, ca. 1801 - 1940" (https://catalog.archives.gov/id/581208).
