= USS LST-1 =

1942 LST-1class tank landing ship

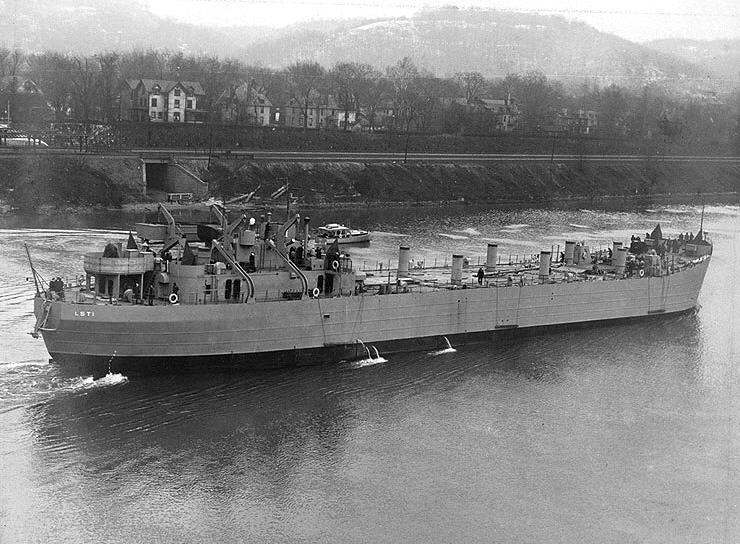
- USS LST-1 underway soon after completion c. December 1942, in the vicinity of Pittsburgh, Pennsylvania

History

United States
- Name: LST-1
- Builder: Dravo Corporation, Pittsburgh, Pennsylvania
- Laid down: 10 June 1942
- Launched: 7 September 1942
- Sponsored by: Mrs. Laurence T. Haugen
- Commissioned: 5 December 1942, reduced commission; 14 December 1942, full commission
- Decommissioned: 21 May 1946
- Stricken: 19 June 1946
- Identification: Hull symbol: LST-1; Code letters: NDNP
- Honors and awards: 4 × battle stars
- Fate: Sold for scrapping, 5 December 1947

General characteristics
- Type: LST-1-class tank landing ship
- Displacement: 4,080 long tons (4,145 t) full load; 2,160 long tons (2,190 t) landing
- Length: 328 ft (100 m) oa
- Beam: 50 ft (15 m)
- Draft: Full load: 8 ft 2 in (2.49 m) forward; 14 ft 1 in (4.29 m) aft; Landing at 2,160 t: 3 ft 11 in (1.19 m) forward; 9 ft 10 in (3.00 m) aft
- Installed power: 2 × 900 hp (670 kW) Electro-Motive Diesel 12-567A diesel engines; 1,700 shp (1,300 kW)
- Propulsion: 1 × Falk main reduction gears; 2 × Propellers
- Speed: 12 kn (22 km/h; 14 mph)
- Range: 24,000 nmi (44,000 km; 28,000 mi) at 9 kn (17 km/h; 10 mph) while displacing 3,960 long tons (4,024 t)
- Boats & landing craft carried: 2 or 6 x LCVPs
- Capacity: 2,100 tons oceangoing maximum; 350 tons main deckload
- Troops: 16 officers, 147 enlisted men
- Complement: 13 officers, 104 enlisted men
- Armament: Varied, ultimate armament; 2 × twin 40 mm (1.57 in) Bofors guns; 4 × single 40 mm Bofors guns; 12 × 20 mm (0.79 in) Oerlikon cannons

Service record
- Operations: Sicilian occupation (9–15 July 1943); Salerno landings (2–21 September 1943); Anzio-Nettuno advanced landings (22 January–1 March 1944); Invasion of Normandy (6–25 June 1944)

USS LST-1 was an LST-1-class tank landing ship of the United States Navy built during World War II. She was the lead ship in her class of 390 and like many of her class, she was not named and is properly referred to by her hull designation.

== Construction ==
LST-1 was laid down on 10 June 1942, at Pittsburgh, Pennsylvania by the Dravo Corporation; launched on 7 September 1942; sponsored by Mrs. Laurence T. Haugen; and commissioned on 14 December 1942.

== Service history ==
During World War II, LST-1 was assigned to the European Theater and participated in the following operations: Allied invasion of Sicily in July 1943; Salerno Landings in September 1943; Anzio-Nettuno advanced landings on the west coast of Italy from January to March 1944; and the Invasion of Normandy in June 1944.

LST-1 was decommissioned on 21 May 1946, and was struck from the Naval Vessel Register on 19 June 1946. On 5 December 1947, she was sold to the Ships Power and Equipment Company of Barber, New Jersey, for scrapping.

== Awards ==
LST-1 earned four battle star for World War II service.

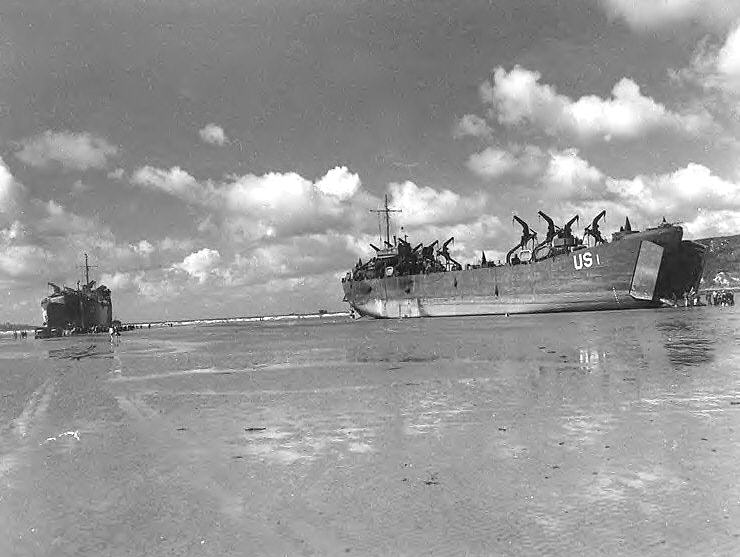
LST-1 (right) and LST-292 "high and dry" on the beach at Saint-Michel-en-Grève, on the north shore of the Brittany Peninsula, during supply operations in support of the campaign against German forces at Brest, France in September 1944. Note the extra davits for additional LCVPs. Taken by a SHAEF photographer.

== Bibliography ==
- "LST-1". Dictionary of American Naval Fighting Ships. Naval History and Heritage Command. This article incorporates text from this source, which is in the public domain.
- "LST-1". NavSource. 5 August 2016.
