= List of types of naval vessels =

This is a list of types of watercraft which have seen naval use.

== Sailing vessel types ==
- Barque
- Barquentine
- Bireme
- Boat
- Bomb vessel
- Brig
- Brigantine
- Caravel
- Clipper
- Cog
- Corvette
- Cutter
- Dromon
- Flyboat
- Frigate
- Full-rigged ship
- Galley
- Galleon
- Hulk
- Junk
- Liburnian
- Longship
- Man-of-war
- Quadrireme
- Quinquereme
- Rocket vessel
- Schooner
- Ship of the line
- Sloop-of-war
- Trireme
- Xebec

== Modern vessel types ==
- Aircraft carrier
  - Anti-submarine warfare carrier
  - Helicopter carrier
- Air-cushioned landing craft
- Amphibious assault ship
- Battlecruiser
- Battleship
  - Pocket battleship
- CAM ship
- Corvette
- Cruiser
  - Protected cruiser
  - Armored cruiser
  - Light cruiser
  - Heavy cruiser
  - Aircraft cruiser
  - Rocket cruiser
- Destroyer
- Dreadnought
- Escort aircraft carrier
- Frigate
  - Steam frigates, including steam sloops and corvettes
- Fast attack craft
- Gunboat
- Hospital ship
- Hydrofoil
- Ironclad
- Landing craft
- Littoral combat ship
- Mine planter
- Minehunter
- Mine countermeasures vessel
- Minesweeper
- Missile boat
- Monitor (warship)
- Patrol boat
- Torpedo boat
- Patrol Torpedo (PT) boat
- Q-ship
- Seaplane tender
- Submarine including U-boat
  - Midget submarine
  - Submarine aircraft carrier
- Submarine chaser
- Survey ship
- Troopship
