= Michael E. Thornton =

United States Navy SEAL, Medal of Honor recipient (born 1949)

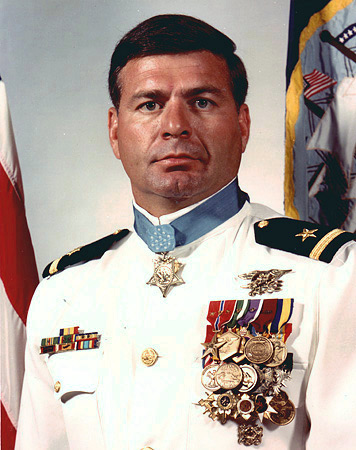
- Thornton as an ensign
- Born: March 23, 1949 (age 77); Greenville, South Carolina, U.S.
- Military career
- Allegiance: United States
- Branch: United States Navy
- Service years: 1967–1992
- Rank: Lieutenant
- Units: SEAL Team 1 SEAL Team 6 MACV-SOG
- Conflicts: Vietnam War; Gulf War
- Awards: Medal of Honor; Silver Star; Bronze Star Medal (3); Purple Heart (2)

Michael Edwin Thornton (born March 23, 1949) is a retired United States Navy SEAL and recipient of the U.S. military's highest decoration, the Medal of Honor, for his actions in the Vietnam War. He was awarded the medal for saving the life of his senior officer, Lieutenant Thomas R. Norris, who also earned the Medal of Honor in an unrelated incident.

== Early life ==
Born on March 23, 1949, in Greenville, South Carolina, Thornton graduated from Torrence high school in 1967 and enlisted in the United States Navy later that year in Spartanburg.

== Military career ==
Thornton served aboard destroyers as a gunner's mate apprentice until November 1968, when he attended United States Navy SEAL selection and training at Coronado, California. He was among only 18 students who graduated from BUD/S class 49 in March 1969, which started with 129 members. He received direct assignment to SEAL Team ONE, a separate organization from the Underwater Demolition Teams to which new personnel normally were assigned. Following SEAL Basic Indoctrination (SBI) training and platoon training, Thornton deployed to South Vietnam with Charlie Platoon from December 1969 to June 1970. He served numerous combat tours in Southeast Asia which ran from 1969 to December 1972.

Thornton conducted intelligence gathering operations across Vietnam. By the last quarter of 1972, U.S. involvement in the region had waned and Thornton, by then a petty officer, was one of only a dozen SEALs remaining in Vietnam.

=== Medal of Honor action ===
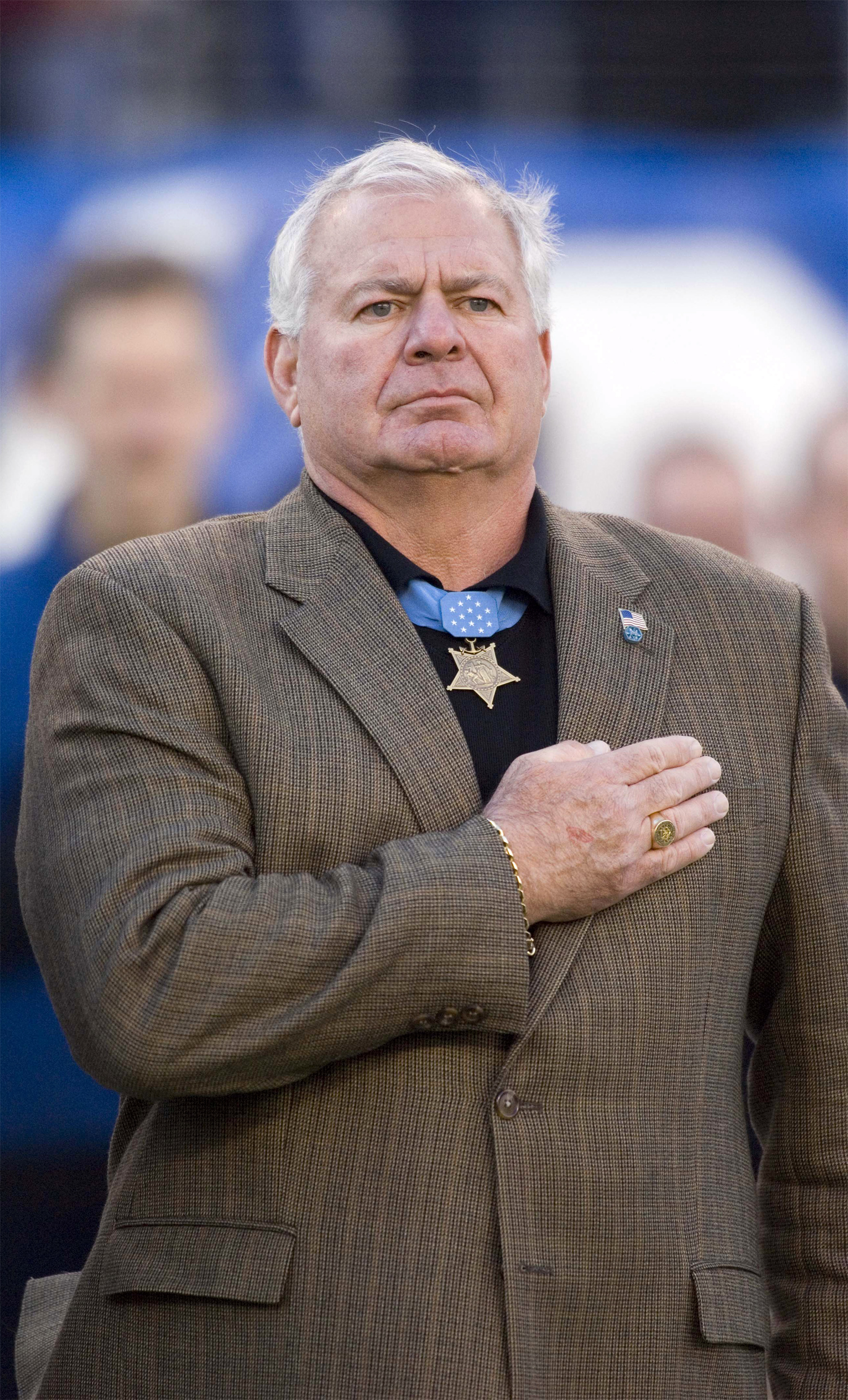
Thornton at the Army–Navy football game on December 2, 2006

On October 31 of that year, Thornton participated in a mission to capture prisoners and gather intelligence from the Cửa Việt Base near the coast of Quảng Trị Province, just south of the Demilitarized Zone. In addition to Thornton, the mission team consisted of SEAL Lieutenant Thomas R. Norris, and three experienced Vietnamese men Thornton had worked with before, members of the LDNN, the South Vietnamese Special Forces. The group was transported by junk until sunset, then paddled a rubber boat to within a mile of shore and swam the remaining distance. Moving inland past numerous North Vietnamese encampments, the group reconnoitered through the night.

The team soon realized that they had landed too far north and were actually in North Vietnam. They found large numbers of bunker complexes and heavy concentrations of North Vietnamese troops. They patrolled slowly through the middle of the enemy troops, gathering intelligence as they went.

The group encountered a two-man North Vietnamese patrol on the beach, which the South Vietnamese attempted to capture. Thornton chased one of the enemy back towards the jungle to prevent him from alerting others. When Thornton shot him, about 50 North Vietnamese soldiers chased after him. Moving from one position to another, Thornton and the others kept the enemy confused about the number of troops they faced. Thornton was wounded in the back by a grenade. He contacted a destroyer and requested naval gunfire support; unknown to Thornton, however, she was struck by North Vietnamese shore batteries and unable to fire. A second destroyer was unable to maneuver into firing position for the same reason.

For the next four hours, the five men held off an enemy force estimated at 150 strong. Norris attempted to call in the Vietnamese junk boats, one of which had a mortar on board, but the destroyers forbade them from entering the line of fire. Thornton, Norris and the three Vietnamese were alone and nearly surrounded. Near dawn, Norris ordered the group to extract towards the beach, and they leap-frogged towards the surf. Norris was able to contact the cruiser USS Newport News and requested that they fire for effect to cover their withdrawal. Norris covered the group's rearward movement. As he prepared to fire a LAW rocket at a group of 70 to 75 North Vietnamese troops attacking his position, he was severely wounded by a round through his head.

One of the South Vietnamese who saw Norris get shot assumed he was dead. Thornton, upon hearing the news, ran about 400 yards (370 m) to the last location he saw Norris to recover the body of his fallen comrade. When he found Norris, he saw that "the whole side of his head was completely gone." As enemy troops overran his position, he stopped to shoot several. Thornton put Norris on his shoulders and ran back towards the beach when the first shell from the Newport News struck the beach. The concussion from the round blew Thornton and Norris 20 feet (6.1 m) into the air. It also slowed the advance of the enemy troops, and Thornton picked up Norris whom he discovered was just barely alive.

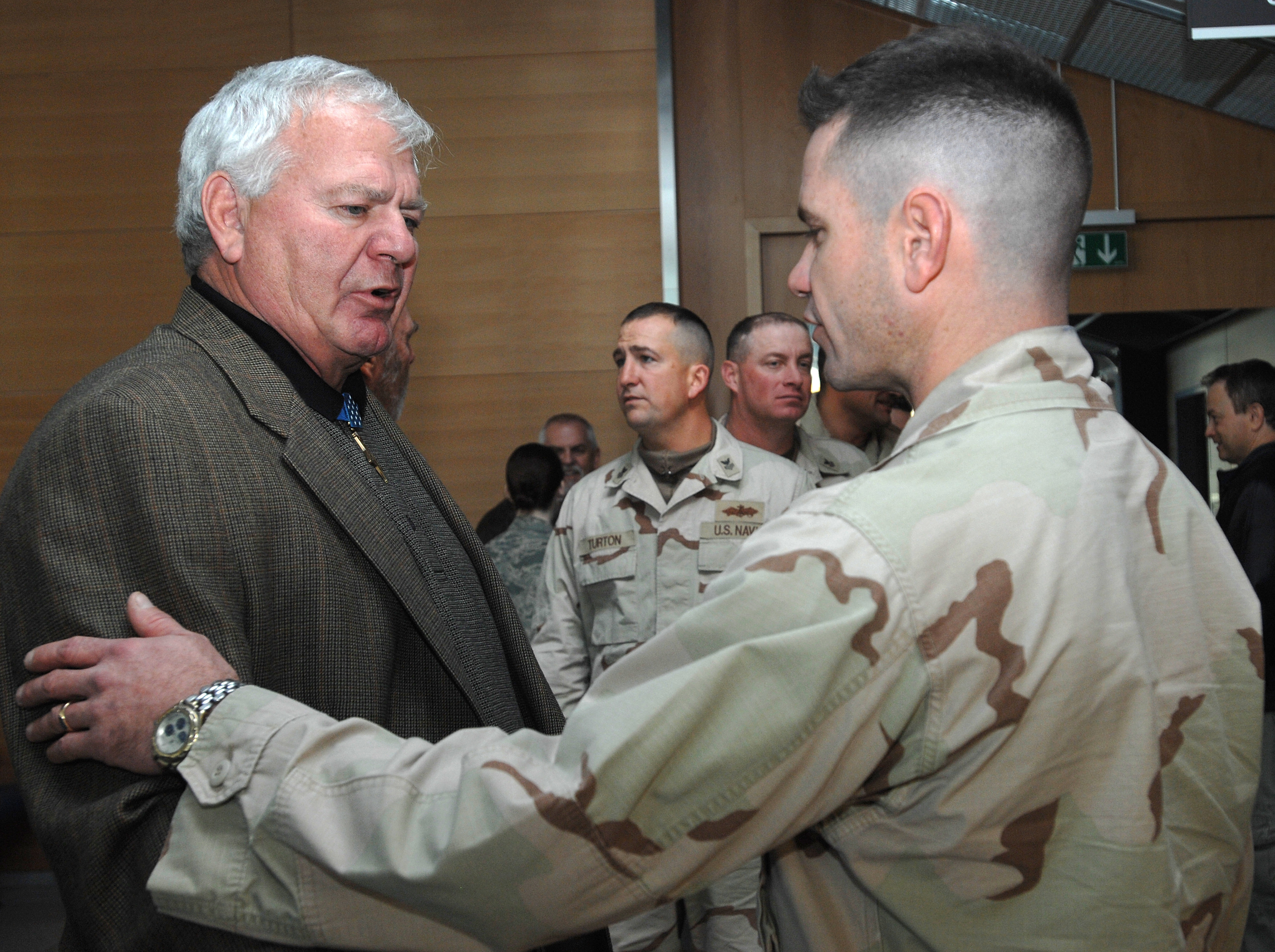
Thornton visiting troops at Ramstein Air Base, 2008

Thornton carried Norris into the surf and began to swim with him. One of the Vietnamese was shot in the buttocks and couldn't swim, so Thornton grabbed him as well and pushed both of them out to sea. Bullets landed in the sea all around them. The Newport News left, thinking that the Americans and South Vietnamese had been killed. Thornton bandaged Norris' wound as well as he could and swam for about three hours. One of the South Vietnamese was finally picked up by the junk. He reported that the two Americans were dead, which was relayed to the Newport News. Thornton fired Norris' AK-47 to draw the attention of the junk. They were picked up and then transported to the Newport News. Thornton carried Norris to the operating room, where the doctor told Thornton, "There's no way he's going to make it."

For these actions, Thornton was awarded the Medal of Honor by President Richard Nixon during a ceremony at the White House on October 15, 1973. The man Thornton rescued, Thomas Norris, survived his wounds and was awarded the Medal of Honor from President Gerald R. Ford in a White House ceremony on March 4, 1976, for his April 1972 rescue of Lieutenant Colonel Iceal Hambleton and First Lieutenant Mark Clark in the rescue of Bat 21 Bravo.

Thornton received a commission in 1982 as a limited duty officer and retired from the navy as a lieutenant in 1992.

=== Citation ===
For conspicuous gallantry and intrepidity at the risk of his life above and beyond the call of duty while participating in a daring operation against enemy forces. PO Thornton, as Assistant U.S. Navy Advisor, along with a U.S. Navy lieutenant serving as Senior Advisor, accompanied a 3-man Vietnamese Navy SEAL patrol on an intelligence gathering and prisoner capture operation against an enemy-occupied naval river base. Launched from a Vietnamese Navy junk in a rubber boat, the patrol reached land and was continuing on foot toward its objective when it suddenly came under heavy fire from a numerically superior force. The patrol called in naval gunfire support and then engaged the enemy in a fierce firefight, accounting for many enemy casualties before moving back to the waterline to prevent encirclement. Upon learning that the Senior Advisor had been hit by enemy fire and was believed to be dead, PO Thornton returned through a hail of fire to the lieutenant's last position; quickly disposed of 2 enemy soldiers about to overrun the position, and succeeded in removing the seriously wounded and unconscious Senior Naval Advisor to the water's edge. He then inflated the lieutenant's lifejacket and towed him seaward for approximately 2 hours until picked up by support craft. By his extraordinary courage and perseverance, PO Thornton was directly responsible for saving the life of his superior officer and enabling the safe extraction of all patrol members, thereby upholding the highest traditions of the U.S. Naval Service.

=== Awards and decorations ===
- Special Warfare insignia
- Naval Parachutist insignia
- Surface Warfare Officer insignia
- Diving Officer insignia

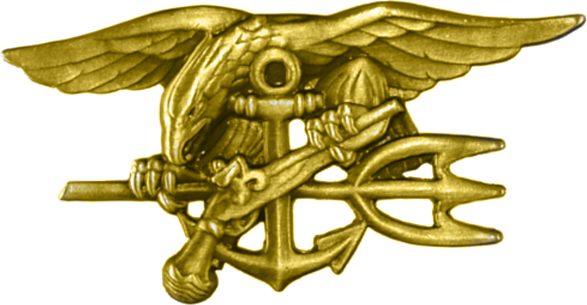

Special Warfare insignia
Medal of Honor		Silver Star	
Bronze Star Medal w/ "V" device and service stars	Purple Heart w/ service star	Meritorious Service Medal	Navy and Marine Corps Commendation Medal w/ "V" device and service stars
Navy and Marine Corps Achievement Medal	Combat Action Ribbon w/ service star	Navy Presidential Unit Citation w/ service stars	Navy Unit Commendation w/ service stars
Navy Meritorious Unit Commendation w/ service star	Navy Good Conduct Medal w/ service stars	Navy Expeditionary Medal	National Defense Service Medal w/ service star
Vietnam Service Medal w/ service stars	Southwest Asia Service Medal w/ service stars	Humanitarian Service Medal	Sea Service Deployment Ribbon
Vietnam Gallantry Cross w/ service star	Vietnam Armed Forces Honor Medal first class	Vietnam Staff Service Medal first class	Vietnam Gallantry Cross unit citation w/ palm
Vietnam Civil Actions unit citation w/ palm	Vietnam Campaign Medal	Navy Expert Rifleman Medal	Navy Expert Pistol Medal
Navy and Marine Corps Parachutist Insignia

== Later career ==
From 1974 to 1977, Thornton served as a BUD/S instructor at NAB Coronado, California, and in 1978 was selected to serve two years with the British Special Boat Squadron (SBS) in an exchange billet. In 1980, Thornton was chosen by Commander Richard Marcinko to be a founding member of SEAL Team Six, the U.S. Navy's first unit dedicated to counter-terrorism. Thornton later became a commissioned officer in June 1982 and retired as a lieutenant in 1992. He currently sits on the board of advisors for Veterans Direct.

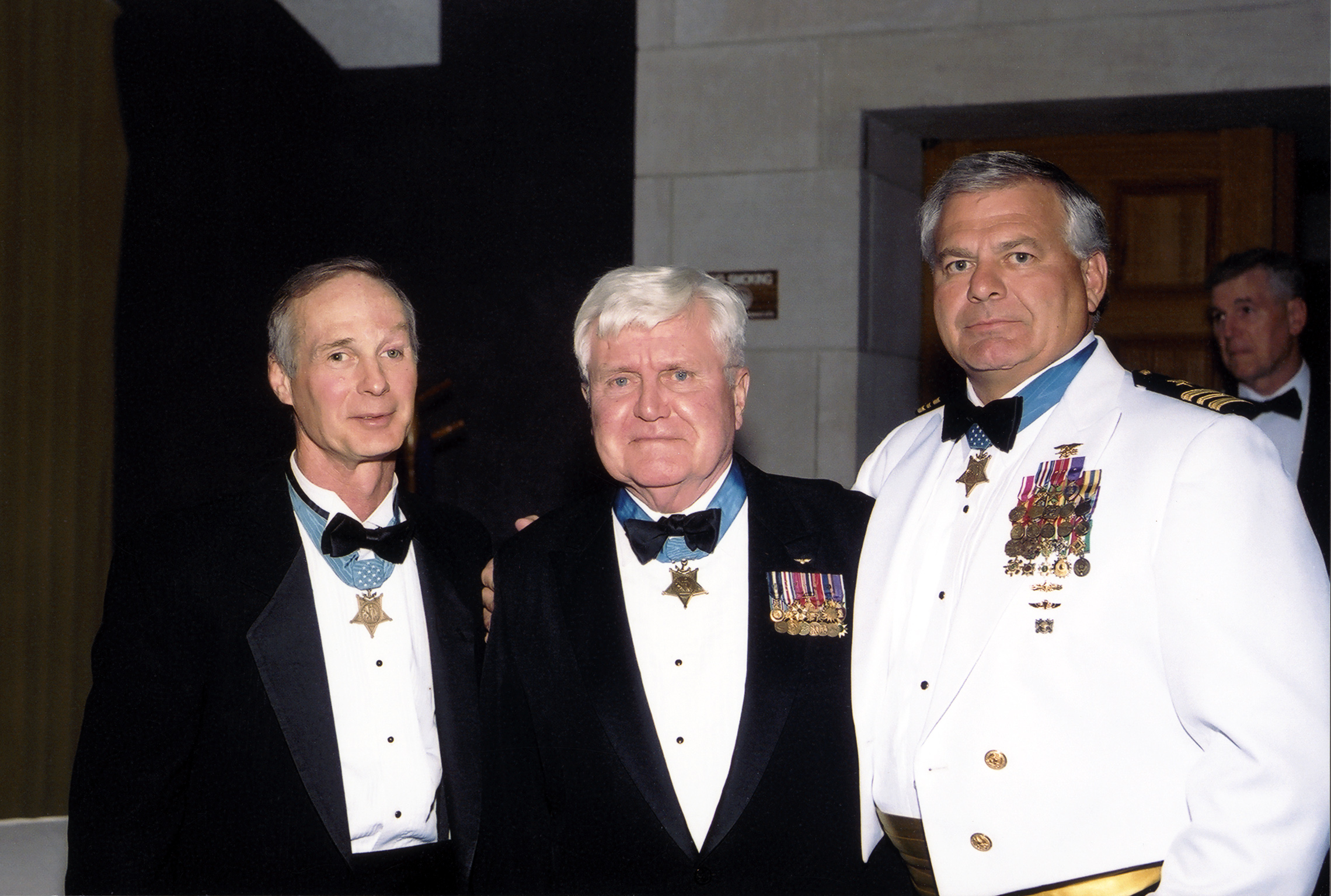
Three members of the American Academy of Achievement and legendary Medal of Honor recipients from the Vietnam War Lt. Thomas R. Norris, USN and Rear Admiral James B. Stockdale, USN with Lt. Michael E. Thornton, USN

In 2001, Thornton received the Golden Plate Award of the American Academy of Achievement presented by Awards Council member Lt. Thomas R. Norris, USN.

== Publications ==
- By Honor Bound: Two Navy SEALs, the Medal of Honor, and a Story of Extraordinary Courage. St. Martin's Press. 2016. ISBN 978-1250070593. Written with Thomas R. Norris and Dick Couch

== See also ==
- List of Medal of Honor recipients for the Vietnam War
