= Nguyễn Văn Kiệt =

Republic of Vietnam Navy sailor

- Born: March 23, 1945 (age 81); Near Saigon, Empire of Vietnam
- Military career
- Allegiance: Republic of Vietnam
- Branch: Republic of Vietnam Navy
- Service years: 1965–1975
- Rank: Petty Officer Third Class
- Conflicts: Vietnam War
- Awards: Navy Cross (United States)

Nguyễn Văn Kiệt (born March 23, 1945) is a former petty officer third class in the Republic of Vietnam Navy and, alongside Trần Văn Bảy, one of only two South Vietnamese and the only South Vietnamese Navy sailor to have been awarded the United States Navy Cross for actions during the Vietnam War.

In April 1972, United States Navy SEAL Lieutenant Thomas R. Norris was one of the few remaining SEALs in Vietnam. When Lieutenant Colonel Iceal Hambleton was shot down behind enemy lines, aerial combat search and rescue operations failed, leading to the loss of five additional aircraft and the death of 11 or more airmen, two captured, and three more down and needing rescue. Norris was tasked with mounting a ground operation to recover Hambleton, Lieutenant Mark Clark, and Lieutenant Bruce Walker from behind enemy lines. Kiệt was one of five Vietnamese commandos to accompany Norris, and when the others refused to pursue the mission further, volunteered to assist Norris. They successfully brought out two of the three downed airmen from more than 2 kilometres (1.2 mi) behind enemy lines.

== Rescue operations ==
Kiệt was a member of the Vietnamese frogmen Naval Advisory Detachment, Sea Commando team, from Đà Nẵng. He was assigned to assist Norris in bringing three downed U.S. airmen from more than 2 kilometres (1.2 mi) behind enemy lines. OV-10 pilot Clark was closest to the team's position and would be rescued first. Clark was relayed instructions to get in the water and float downstream where Norris and his team would intercept him. Lt. Col. Andrew E. Anderson (USMC) ordered Norris to take his team no more than 1 kilometre (0.62 mi) forward and wait for the survivors to come to them, but Norris defied the order, turned off his radio and avoiding numerous enemy patrols, went twice that distance. Anderson, Norris, and Kiệt, along with four other Vietnamese commandos set up an overwatch position near the Miêu Giang River, which ran near the positions of both downed airmen.

Clark was seriously weakened by five days hiding from the enemy with little to eat. On the night of 9 April, Norris, Kiệt and the commandos retrieved him from the river and got him to friendly territory. The next night they set out to find Hambleton. During their search that night two of the commandos refused to press the mission further, saying they "refused to follow an American just to rescue an American." As dawn approached, Norris was going to proceed alone when Kiệt volunteered to stay with him. They took an abandoned sampan and cautiously searched the river shore for two more hours without success. They reluctantly returned to their forward operating base to rest and hope they would be more successful the next night. Forward air controller Harold Icke on Bilk 11 fixed Hambleton's position during the day so Norris and Kiệt could find him that night.

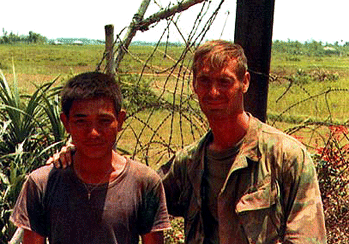
Lieutenant Thomas R. Norris and Petty Officer Third Class Nguyễn Văn Kiệt went behind enemy lines disguised as fishermen in a sampan to rescue Lieutenant Colonel Iceal Hambleton. Norris was awarded the Medal of Honor and Kiệt was recognized with the Navy Cross for their actions.

On the night of 12 April, Norris and Kiệt found a deserted village and clothing which they used to disguise themselves as fishermen. They took advantage of the abandoned sampan to row quietly up the river. Even in the pitch dark and dense fog, they could see large numbers of North Vietnamese soldiers and tanks on the shoreline. Traveling upriver in the sampan, they broke out of the heavy fog and found themselves under the Cam Lộ bridge. They had passed Hambleton's position more than 30 minutes previously. Turning around, they finally found Hambleton sitting in a clump of bushes, alive but partly delirious. Sunrise was coming, and although Norris thought it best to wait until dark to return downriver, he needed to be evacuated immediately. Despite the risk, they hid Hambleton in the bottom of the sampan, covered him with bamboo, and started downriver.

Their sampan was soon spotted by North Vietnamese troops, some of whom fired at them, but Norris and Kiệt could not afford to return fire. They traveled down river and Norris called in air support to eliminate the North Vietnamese shooting at them from the northern bank. They rescued Clark and Hambleton, but Walker was discovered and killed by the NVA before they could return to rescue him. A book written about Kiệt's heroism by William Charles Anderson was later adapted into a 1988 movie, Bat*21. In 1999, after the release of considerable classified information, a second book, The Rescue of Bat 21, was published by Darrel D. Whitcomb. Kiệt emigrated to the United States, and, as of 2008, resided in Washington State.

== Post war ==
Kiệt became a U.S. citizen in 1984 and moved to Seattle, where he worked for the Boeing Corporation for almost 20 years before retiring in 2005.

== Navy Cross citation ==
Thomas Norris readily supported nomination of Kiệt for the Navy Cross, the highest award the United States Navy can give to a foreign national.

The President of the United States takes pleasure in presenting the Navy Cross to:

NGUYEN VAN KIET, PETTY OFFICER THIRD CLASS, NAVY OF THE REPUBLIC OF VIETNAM

Citation

For extraordinary heroism while serving with friendly forces engaged in armed conflict against the North Vietnamese and Viet Cong communist aggressors in the Republic of Vietnam. On 13 April 1972, Petty Officer Kiet participated in an unprecedented recovery operation for a downed United States aviator behind enemy lines in Quang Tri Province, Republic of Vietnam. He courageously volunteered to accompany a United States SEAL Advisor Thomas R. Norris (Medal Of Honor) in an extremely hazardous attempt to reach the aviator, who was physically unable to move toward friendly positions. Using a sampan and traveling throughout the night, they silently made their way deep into enemy territory, past numerous major enemy positions, locating the pilot at dawn. Once, after being spotted by a North Vietnamese patrol, he calmly continued to keep the enemy confused as the small party successfully evaded the patrol. Later, they were suddenly taken under heavy machine gun fire. Thinking first of the pilot, he quickly pulled the sampan to safety behind a bank and camouflaged it while air strikes were called on the enemy position. Due to Petty Officer Kiet's coolness under extremely dangerous conditions and his outstanding courage and professionalism, an American aviator was recovered after an eleven-day ordeal behind enemy lines. His self-discipline, personal courage, and dynamic fighting spirit were an inspiration to all; thereby reflecting great credit upon himself and the Naval Service.

== See also ==
- Nguyễn Qúy An – Major in the Republic of Vietnam Air Force and a recipient of the United States Distinguished Flying Cross.
- Studies and Observations Group
