= Erich Anderson =

American actor (1957–2024)

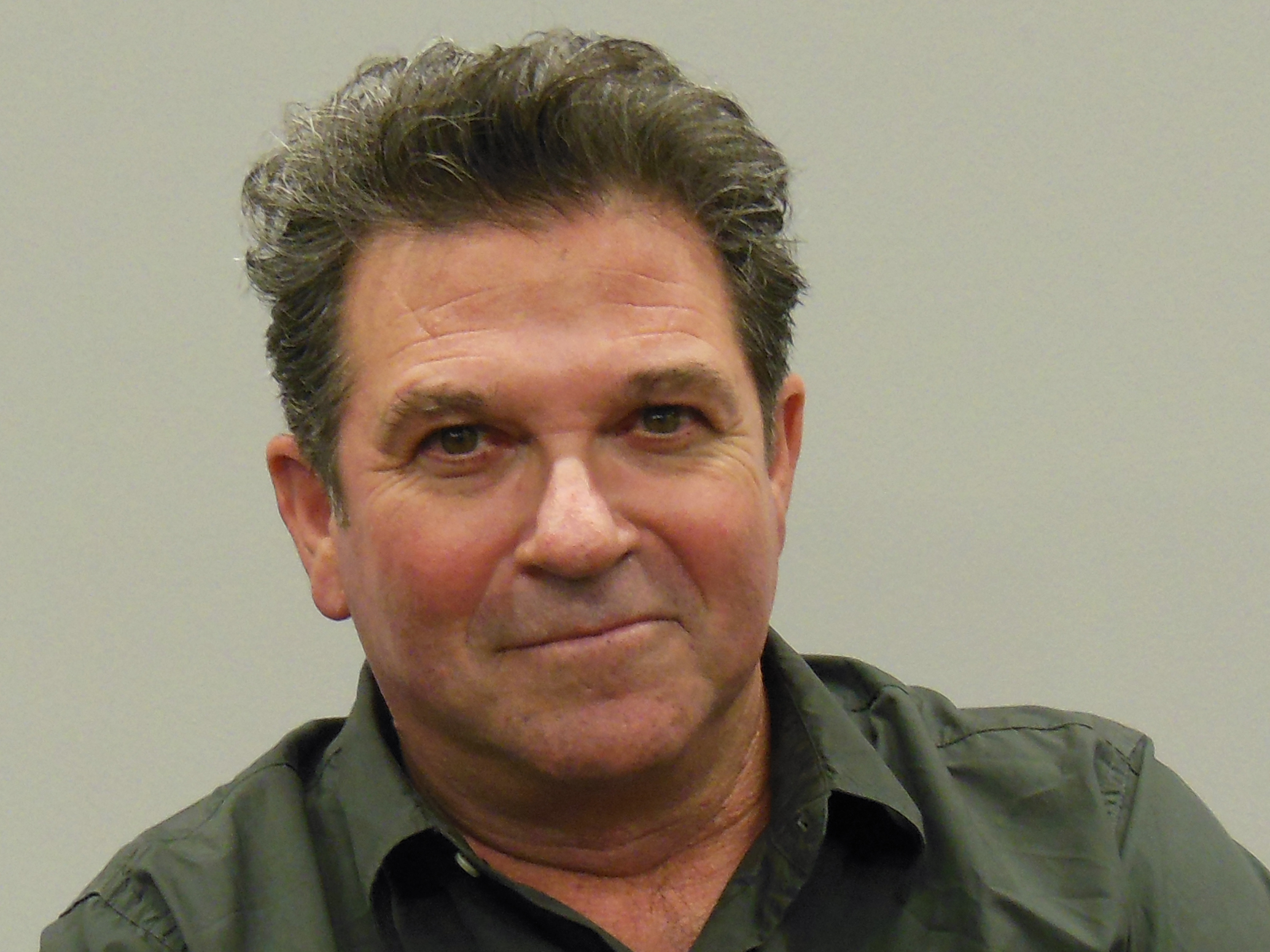
- Anderson in 2016
- Born: Edward Erich Anderson; October 24, 1956; Sagamihara, Japan
- Died: June 1, 2024 (aged 67); Los Angeles, California, U.S.
- Other name: E. Erich Anderson
- Education: University of California, Santa Barbara
- Occupations: Actor; novelist
- Years active: 1983–2022
- Notable work: Friday the 13th: The Final Chapter
- Spouse: Saxon Trainor (m. 2003)

Edward Erich Anderson (October 24, 1956 – June 1, 2024) was an American actor and novelist. He starred in film and on television, and was widely known for his role in the 1984 horror film Friday the 13th: The Final Chapter as Rob Dier. He also starred in the 1988 film Bat*21 and in the 2002 drama film Unfaithful.

== Background ==
Edward Erich Anderson was born on October 24, 1956, to an American family in Sagamihara, Japan. He grew up in a military family, and moved frequently throughout his childhood. He attended Hilltop High School in Chula Vista, California, and went on to study biochemistry and molecular biology at the University of California, Santa Barbara. He initially aspired to attend medical school, but eventually decided to pursue acting.

== Career ==
Among Anderson's early roles was a role on Bay City Blues in 1983. During this time, he was cast in Friday the 13th: The Final Chapter.

Anderson appeared on over 300 television episodes through his career. Noted television appearances included the series Second Chances as Bruce Christianson, thirtysomething as Billy Sidel, and Felicity as Felicity's father. He also guest starred on Melrose Place as Courtney Thorne-Smith's psychiatrist. Anderson acted on episodes of Murder, She Wrote, CSI, CSI: Miami, Star Trek: The Next Generation in the Season 5 episode "Conundrum" as Commander Kieran MacDuff, and Boomtown as D.A. Ben Fisher. He also appeared in Season 3 Episode 19 of US drama House. He also had a role as Evan, the lead character in The Outer Limits Season 2 Episode 16 "The Deprogrammers" which co-starred Brent Spiner.

Anderson also published three novels between 2012 and 2022.

== Personal life and death ==
Anderson was married to actress Saxon Trainor. He died from esophageal cancer at his home in Los Angeles, on June 1, 2024, at the age of 67.

== Select filmography ==
Film and television roles
| Year | Title | Role | Notes |
|---|---|---|---|
| 1984 | Friday the 13th: The Final Chapter | Rob Dier | Film |
| 1984 | Missing in Action | Masucci | Film |
| 1986 | Welcome to 18 | Roscoe | Film |
| 1987–1991 | Thirtysomething | Billy Sidel | 7 episodes |
| 1988 | Patty Hearst | 1st Male | Film |
| 1988 | Bat*21 | Major Jake Scott | Film |
| 1992 | Star Trek: The Next Generation | Commander Kieran MacDuff | Episode: "Conundrum" |
| 1994 | Matlock | Tom McGuire | Episode: "The Dating Game" |
| 1994 | The Glass Shield | District Attorney Ira Kern | Film |
| 1995 | The Final Cut | Talberg | Film |
| 1996 | Infinity | Gil | Film |
| 1997 | Nightwatch | Newscaster | Film |
| 1998 | Felicity | Dr. Edward Porter | 9 episodes |
| 1998 | Without Limits | Collin Pounder | Uncredited |
| 1998 | Where's Marlowe? | Detective Simmons | Film |
| 1999 | Thick as Thieves | Tenesco | Film |
| 2000 | Auggie Rose | Paul | Film |
| 2002 | Unfaithful | Bob Gaylord | Film |
| 2006 | Special | Newscaster | Film |
| 2007 | House (TV series) | Deran | Episode: "Act Your Age" |
| 2009 | His Name Was Jason: 30 Years of Friday the 13th | Himself | Documentary film |
| 2013 | Crystal Lake Memories: The Complete History of Friday the 13th | Himself | Documentary film |
| 2016 | Officer Downe | The Bartender | Film |
| 2017 | The Neighbor | Brian | Film |
| 2018 | Cold Brook | Meisenger | Film |
