= Conundrum (Star Trek: The Next Generation) =

- Star Trek: The Next Generation episode
- Episode no.: Season 5 Episode 14
- Directed by: Les Landau
- Story by: Paul Schiffer
- Teleplay by: Barry Schkolnick
- Production code: 214
- Original air date: February 17, 1992

Guest appearances
- Michelle Forbes - Ro Laren; Erich Anderson - Kieran MacDuff; Liz Vassey - Kristin; Erick Weiss - Kane; Majel Barrett - Computer Voice

Episode chronology
← Previous "The Masterpiece Society"	Next → "Power Play"
- Star Trek: The Next Generation season 5

"Conundrum" is the 14th episode of the fifth season of the American science fiction television series Star Trek: The Next Generation, and the 114th episode overall. It aired in syndication starting February 10, 1992.

In this episode, the entire crew suffers complete memory loss after an unknown alien ship scans the Enterprise. Although unable to recall their names or duties, they quickly realize that somehow they still know how to operate the starship. With their memories limited, no one notices that Kieran MacDuff, identified by the ship's computer as the Enterprise's first officer, is someone they have never seen before. The computer also provides evidence that they are on a mission to cross into Lysian space and destroy that species' central command, as well as any Lysian vessel that attempts to stop them. Somehow, it all seems wrong to Picard, but MacDuff insists that the crew follow the orders they have been given.

The episode won an Emmy Award for Outstanding Special Visual Effects.

== Plot ==
After being scanned by an unknown alien spaceship, the Enterprise crew discover that their personal memories and the personnel files in the ship's computer have been partially erased. They do not remember each other or their own identities. Unbeknownst to the crew, a mysterious new member has joined the bridge.

The bridge crew recover the personnel files in the ship's computer and re-learn their own names and positions aboard the Enterprise. With no knowledge of their prior contentious relationship, Commander Riker and Ensign Ro Laren are immediately attracted to each other and engage in a brief sexual relationship. The computer claims the Federation is engaged in a protracted war with an alien race called the Lysians, and the Enterprise's mission is to destroy the Lysian central command while maintaining communications silence. The manifest identifies the new member as Commander Kieran MacDuff, first officer of the Enterprise. MacDuff volunteers for Doctor Crusher's attempt to restore the memories of the crew, but apparently reacts poorly to the treatment and discourages further attempts.

The Enterprise encounters and easily destroys a Lysian ship, and closes in on the Lysian central command without difficulty. Noting the Lysians' extremely limited defenses and firepower, Picard expresses suspicion about the alleged state of warfare and questions the order to destroy the central command. MacDuff insists on carrying out the attack and attempts to take control of the Enterprise, but is subdued by Worf and Riker.

MacDuff is identified as a Satarran, an alien race at war with the Lysians who attempted to use the Enterprise against the Lysians. Picard apologizes to the Lysians for their attack, and Dr. Crusher is able to restore memories to the crew. In Ten Forward, Ro and Counselor Troi both gently tease Riker over his tryst with Ro.

== Reception ==
In 2014, IO9 rated "Conundrum" the 82nd greatest episode of Star Trek.

In 2017, Screen Rant ranked "Conundrum" as the 14th most hopeful episode of all Star Trek episodes up to that time. The episode was noted for being optimistic, because of the crew's compassion, and for its humor.

In 2017, SyFy rated the Satarrans featured in this episode, one of the top 11 most bizarre aliens of Star Trek: The Next Generation.

In 2019, Den of Geek recommended rewatching this episode while waiting for new episodes of Star Trek: Picard.

In 2020, Screen Rant ranked "Conundrum" the 14th best episode of Star Trek: The Next Generation, pointing out it "gave viewers a chance to know the characters a bit more."

== Awards ==
This episode won an Emmy Award for Outstanding Special Visual Effects; a second award, in the same category (common at the time), went to the episode "A Matter of Time".

== Releases ==
The episode was released in the United States on November 5, 2002, as part of the season five DVD box set. The first Blu-ray release was in the United States on November 18, 2013, followed by the United Kingdom the next day, November 19, 2013.
