= Bat*21 =

1988 film directed by Peter Markle

- Theatrical release poster
- Directed by: Peter Markle
- Screenplay by: William C. Anderson; George Gordon
- Based on: BAT-21: Based on the true story of Lieutenant Colonel Iceal E. Hambleton, USAF (book) by William C. Anderson
- Produced by: David Fisher; Gary A. Neill; Michael Balson; Jerry Reed (executive producer)
- Starring: Gene Hackman; Danny Glover; Jerry Reed; David Marshall Grant; Clayton Rohner; Erich Anderson; Joe Dorsey
- Cinematography: Mark Irwin
- Edited by: Stephen E. Rivkin
- Music by: Christopher Young
- Production company: Vision PDG
- Distributed by: Tri-Star Pictures
- Release date: October 21, 1988
- Running time: 105 minutes
- Country: United States
- Language: English
- Budget: $10.5 million
- Box office: $3.1 million

Bat*21 is a 1988 American war drama film directed by Peter Markle, and adapted from the 1980 book by William C. Anderson, novelist and retired United States Air Force colonel. (Note: BAT-21: Based on the true story of Lieutenant Colonel Iceal E. Hambleton, USAF was also published as Bat-21 and Bat-21: Sam on the Scope; also released as an Ebook.) Set during the Vietnam War, the film is a dramatization based upon the rescue of a U.S. air navigator shot down behind enemy lines in Vietnam. The film stars Gene Hackman and Danny Glover with Jerry Reed, David Marshall Grant, Clayton Rohner, Erich Anderson and Joe Dorsey in supporting roles.

== Plot ==
During the last days of the Vietnam War, USAF Lieutenant Colonel Iceal E. "Gene" Hambleton, call sign BAT-21 Bravo, is flying aboard an EB-66C electronic warfare aircraft, engaged in electronic countermeasures preparatory to a major bombing strike. Without warning, a number of SA-2 Guideline SAMs are launched from North Vietnam, targeting their aircraft. A massive SAM explosion tears off the tail and Hambleton, in the navigator's position, ejects as the sole survivor of the six-man crew.

While still coming down by parachute, Hambleton makes radio contact with Captain Bartholomew "Birddog" Clark, the pilot of a Cessna O-2 Skymaster, flying a forward air control mission near where the EB-66 was destroyed. Birddog becomes Hambleton's link to rescue.

Hambleton, an expert on electronic weapons systems and who holds valuable information, is known to the North Vietnamese, who begin an all-out search, attempting to capture him. An effort to steal supplies from Vietnamese villagers is not successful, as Hambleton is discovered and kills an aggressive peasant farmer, apologizing to his grieving family as he escapes.

Knowing that his current location is too dangerous for rescue aircraft, Hambleton devises a plan to reach safer territory. He plots a course to the river which is the boundary of the target area, then communicates his intended path to Clark in a code composed of various golf courses he knows well. This will allow the rescuers to keep track of his progress, making it easier for them to pick him up.

Several attempts are made to recover Hambleton. Two helicopters are lost and members of its crews are killed or captured. Clark ultimately flies a "Huey" helicopter rescue mission, but as he retrieves Hambleton, the pair are shot down by ground fire, with Clark being wounded. An F-100 bombing raid both assists and hinders their progress through the jungle, as North Vietnamese irregulars are trailing them. In the end, Hambleton and Clark are rescued by a USN PCF patrolling nearby on the Cam Lo River.

=== Historical accuracy ===
Portions of Bat*21 were highly dramatized, including the climactic battle. Some characters were composites of real people, while others were created for the film. However, some other details were accurate, including that rescuer Captain Larry Potts was African American.

The actual rescue took over eleven days, during which a major attack was delayed, resulting in numerous South Vietnamese soldiers being killed and wounded. A Forward Air Observer aircraft was shot down and USAF 1Lt Bruce Walker and USMC 1Lt Larry Potts parachuted to the ground safely, eluding capture. In an ensuing attack, six more Americans lost their lives attempting to rescue him.

The North Vietnamese, alerted by the intense efforts to find the flyer, increased their efforts to find Hambleton. Walker was discovered and killed by the Vietnamese forces. During a covert nighttime operation more than 2 miles (3.2 km) behind enemy lines, Hambleton was rescued in a land operation by U.S. Navy SEAL LTJG Thomas R. Norris and VNN Petty Officer Third Class Nguyen Van Kiet.

== Cast ==
- Gene Hackman as Lieutenant Colonel Iceal Hambleton
- Danny Glover as Captain Bartholomew Clark (Call sign: "Birddog")
- Jerry Reed as Colonel George Walker
- David Marshall Grant as WO1 Ross Carver ('Jolly Green' Pilot)
- Clayton Rohner as Sergeant Harley Rumbaugh
- Erich Anderson as Major Jake Scott
- Joe Dorsey as Colonel Douglass
- Reverend Michael Ng as Vietnamese Man
- Theodore Chan Woei-Shyong as Boy on Bridge
- Don Ruffin as Helicopter Crew Member
- Scott A. Howell as Helicopter Crew Member
- Michael Raden as Helicopter Crew Member
- Timothy Fitzgerald as EB-66 Officer
- Stuart Hagen as EB-66 Officer
- Jeff Baxter as Helicopter Gunner
- Alan King as Helicopter Gunner
- Bonnie Yong as NVA/VC Officer
- Willie Lai as NVA/VC Officer
- Martin Yong as NVA/VC Soldier
- Jim Aman as NVA/VC Soldier
- Freddie Chin as NVA/VC Soldier
- Dennis Chong as NVA/VC Soldier
- Liow Hui Chun as NVA/VC Soldier
- Fung Yun Khiong as NVA/VC Soldier
- Henry Lee as NVA/VC Soldier
- Michael Lee as NVA/VC Soldier
- Jeffrey Liew as NVA/VC Soldier
- Fredolin Leong as NVA/VC Soldier
- Benedict Lojingkau as NVA/VC Soldier
- Johnny Michael as NVA/VC Soldier
- Clarence Mojikon as NVA/VC Soldier
- Wilod Nuin as NVA/VC Soldier
- Harold Sinpang as NVA/VC Soldier
- Paul Yong as NVA/VC Soldier
- Conidon Wong as NVA VC Soldier

== Production ==
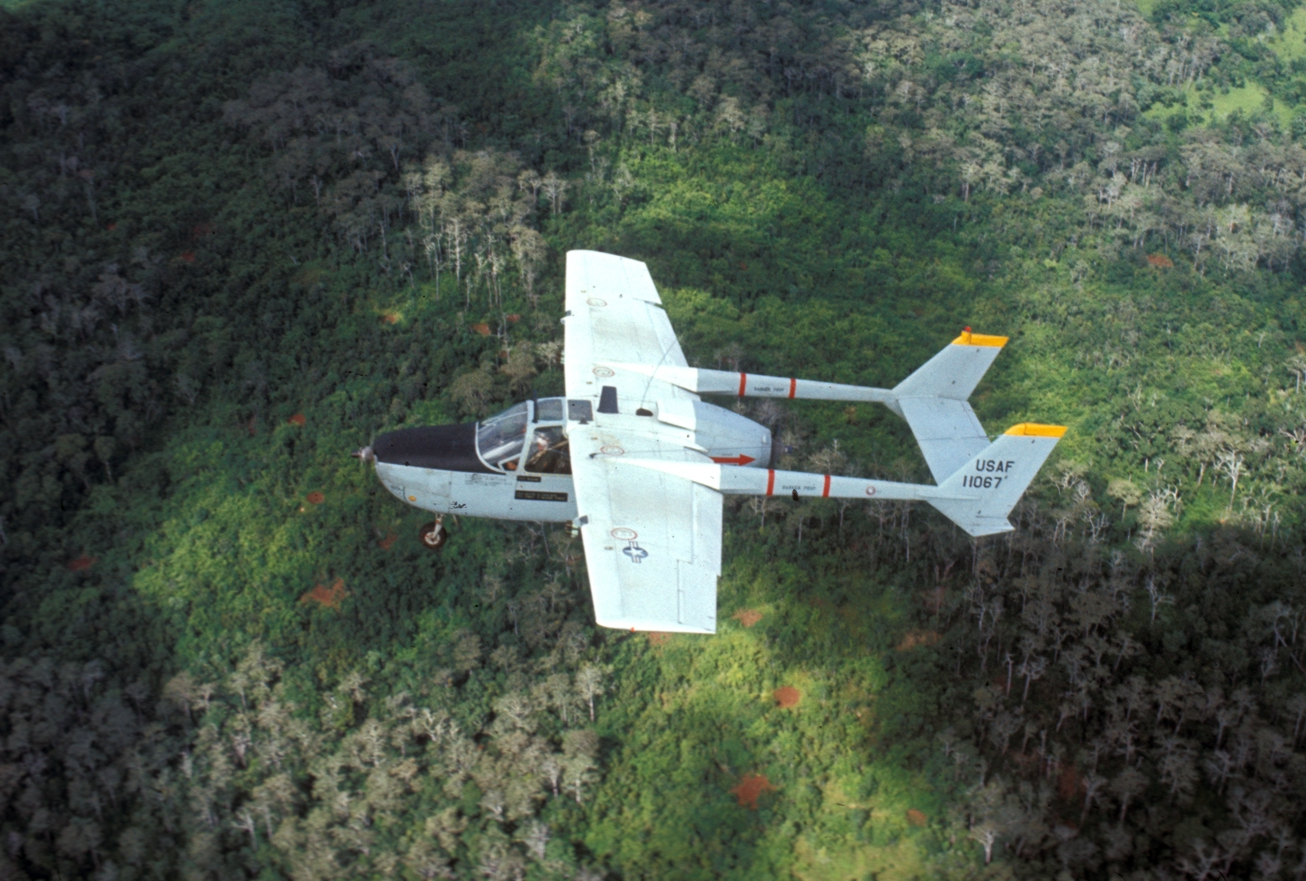
A Cessna O-2 Skymaster featured prominently in Bat*21.

Bat*21 was filmed entirely on location in Sabah, Malaysia, with the assistance of the Malaysian government. Resources, locations and other assistance were supplied by the Malaysian Army and the Royal Malaysian Air Force, which supplied aircraft and pilots, including the services of Captain V. Thiagarajah, who flew both on- and off-camera.

Helicopters used for the filming included Bell UH-1N ‘Hueys’, and Sea King helicopters of the Royal Malaysian Air Force.

The fighter jets used were F-5 Freedom Fighters.

== Release ==
The film premiered in the Philippines on September 8, 1988. It premiered in the United States on October 21.

== Reception ==
Film historian Alun Evans in Brassey's Guide to War Films, considered the production an unusual look at "... the perspective of a service non-combatant." In a contemporary review, Roger Ebert noted: "'BAT*21' is the kind of lean, no-nonsense war film Hollywood used to make back before the subject became burdened with metaphysical insights." Listed in the "best" category of "The Best (and Worst) War Movies of All Time", Popular Mechanics, characterized Bat*21 as the "Best Vietnam War Movie."

Rotten Tomatoes gives the film a rating of 82% from 17 reviews.
