= Thomas R. Norris =

United States Navy Medal of Honor recipient (born 1944)

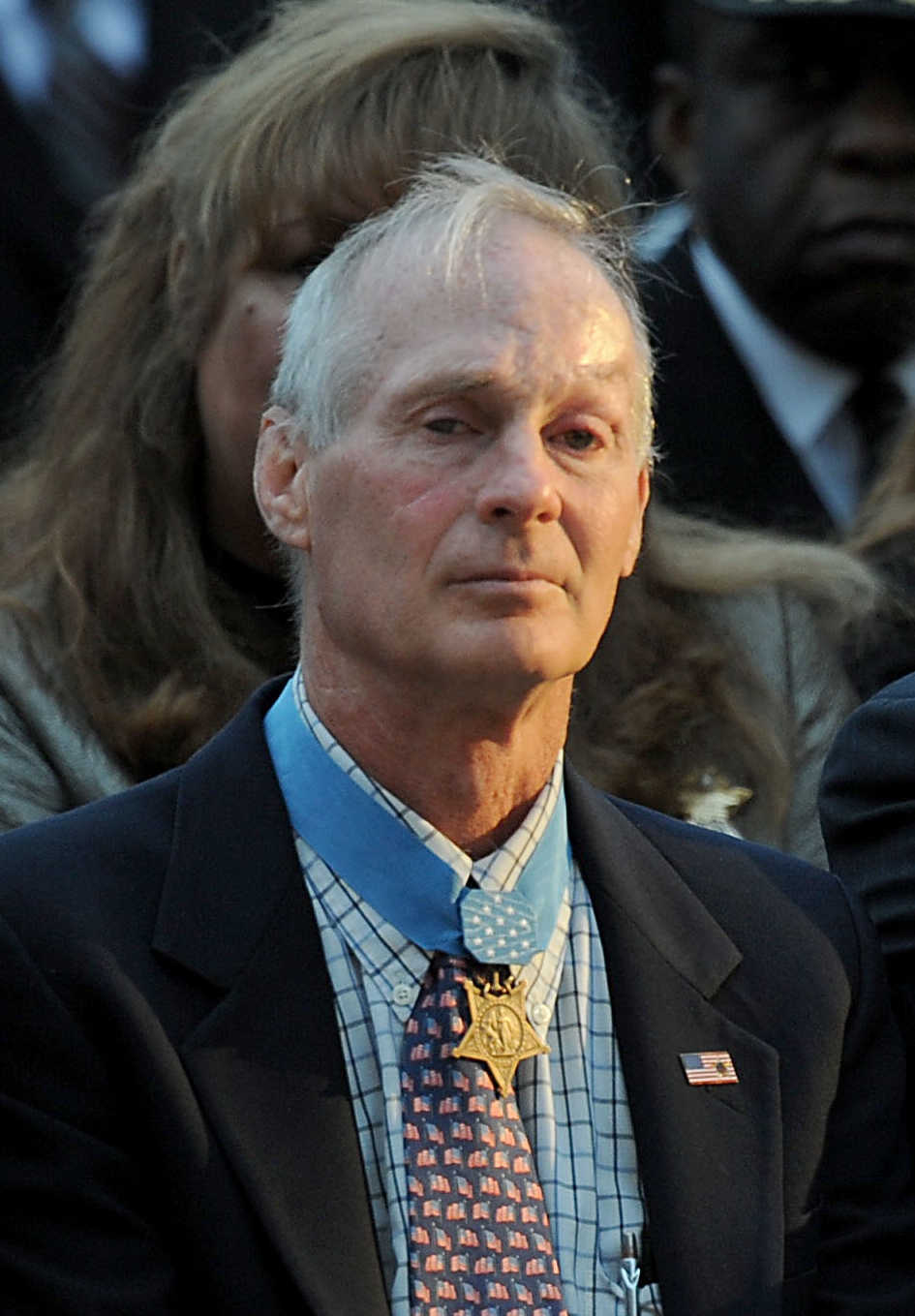
- Norris in 2008
- Born: January 14, 1944 (age 82); Jacksonville, Florida, U.S.
- Alma mater: University of Maryland (BS)
- Military career
- Allegiance: United States
- Branch: United States Navy
- Service years: 1967–1975
- Rank: Lieutenant
- Nickname: Tommy
- Units: SEAL Team 2 MACV-SOG
- Conflicts: Vietnam War
- Awards: Medal of Honor; Silver Star; Bronze Star Medal (3); Purple Heart
- Other work: FBI Special Agent

Thomas Rolland Norris (born January 14, 1944) is a retired United States Navy SEAL and Distinguished Eagle Scout, who received the Medal of Honor for his ground rescue with the assistance of Petty Officer Third Class Nguyen Van Kiet of two downed aircrew members in Quảng Trị province during the Vietnam War on April 10–13, 1972. At the time of the action, Lieutenant Norris was a SEAL Advisor with the Strategic Technical Directorate Assistance Team. Norris was one of three SEALs to receive the Medal of Honor for actions during the Vietnam War.

== Early life and education ==
Norris was born on January 14, 1944, in Jacksonville, Florida. He grew up in Wisconsin and Washington, D.C. As a youth, he was a member of the Boy Scouts of America and attained the rank of Eagle Scout. He graduated from Montgomery Blair High School in Silver Spring, Maryland, and then entered the University of Maryland in 1963, with the intent of pursuing a criminology career with the Federal Bureau of Investigation (FBI). He earned a Bachelor of Science degree in sociology with a specialty in criminology in 1967.

While at the University of Maryland, Norris was an Atlantic Coast Conference college wrestling champion in 1965 and 1966.

== Career ==
=== United States Navy ===
Norris enlisted in the United States Navy when his student deferment from the draft was not extended. He hoped to join the Navy and fly jets, but he had problems with his visual acuity and depth perception that disqualified him from becoming a pilot. He then became a Navy SEAL. Norris struggled during BUD/S training, and the instructors considered removing him from the course. However, the instructors decided to allow Norris to try to finish the training, and he graduated from BUD/S class 45 in July 1969 at Naval Amphibious Base Little Creek. Norris completed his first tour of duty in South Vietnam with Fifth Platoon, SEAL Team TWO from February to August 1970 earning Bronze Star Medal with combat "V" device.

==== Ground rescue operation ====
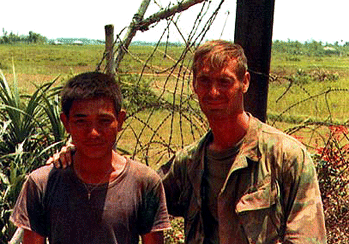
Lieutenant Norris and Petty Officer Third Class Nguyen Van Kiet went behind enemy lines disguised as fishermen in a sampan to rescue Lieutenant Colonel Iceal Hambleton. Norris was awarded the Medal of Honor and Nguyen was recognized with the Navy Cross for their actions.

In April 1972, Norris was one of few remaining SEALs in Vietnam serving with MACVSOG Danang Naval Advisory Detachment. When Lieutenant Colonel Iceal Hambleton, USAF, a senior planning officer flying as an EB-66 Destroyer electronic warfare officer, was shot down behind enemy lines, aerial combat search and rescue operations failed, leading to the loss of five additional aircraft and the death of 11 or more airmen, two captured, and three more down and needing rescue. Norris was tasked with mounting a ground operation to recover Hambleton, Lieutenant Mark Clark, and Lieutenant Bruce Walker from behind enemy lines. Assisted by Vietnamese Sea Commando forces, he and Republic of Vietnam Navy Petty Officer Nguyen Van Kiet went more than 2 kilometers (1.2 mi) behind enemy lines and successfully rescued two of the downed American aviators. Walker was discovered and killed by the North Vietnamese Army. Though Norris at first rejected the honor, he was recognized with the Medal of Honor in 1975.

==== Intelligence gathering mission ====
Six months later, on October 31, 1972, Norris and fellow Navy SEAL Michael E. Thornton accompanied three South Vietnamese special forces soldiers on an intelligence gathering operation south of the demilitarized zone. They intended to reconnoiter the area around the Cửa Việt Base near the coast of Quảng Trị Province, just south of the Demilitarized Zone.

Approaching by sea, the group was transported by junk until sunset, then paddled a rubber boat to within a mile of shore and swam the remaining distance. Moving inland past numerous North Vietnamese encampments, the group reconnoitered through the night.

When morning dawned, the five-man group realized that they had landed 5 miles (8.0 km) to the north and were actually in North Vietnam. They soon encountered a two-man North Vietnamese patrol, which the South Vietnamese attempted to capture. Instead, enemy troops were alerted to their position. For the next four hours, the five men held off an enemy force estimated at 200–300 strong. Norris called in naval firepower on the enemy's positions, helping to keep them alive.

The North Vietnamese regrouped and surrounded the troops, and the SEALs and South Vietnamese decided to withdraw. Norris protected their rear while the others moved towards the water. He was shot in the head and severely wounded. One of the South Vietnamese who saw Norris' wound assumed he was dead. Thornton, upon hearing the news, ran through heavy fire to recover the body of his fallen comrade, only to discover that Norris was still just barely alive. He killed several North Vietnamese as they surmounted the dunes around his position and then carried the unconscious Norris into the water.

Thornton also carried one of the South Vietnamese soldiers who had been wounded and was unable to swim into the ocean. Thornton swam and supported the two injured men for more than two hours before they were picked up by the same junk that had dropped them off the night before.

Thornton was recognized with the Medal of Honor for his actions of April 1972 by President Richard Nixon during a ceremony at the White House on October 15, 1973. He snuck Norris out of the hospital in the middle of the night so Norris could attend the ceremony. Norris was later awarded the Medal of Honor by President Gerald R. Ford in a White House ceremony on March 6, 1976. Norris thus became the first Medal of Honor recipient recognized for their life having been saved by another Medal of Honor recipient. Norris lost an eye and part of his skull. He spent three years recovering from his injuries in the hospital and over a six-year period underwent many major surgeries, and his first surgery lasted 19 hours. As a result of the head injury, he was medically retired from the Navy in May 1975.

== FBI ==
In 1979, Norris joined the Federal Bureau of Investigation (FBI) and requested a waiver for his disabilities. FBI director William Webster responded, "If you can pass the same test as anybody else applying for this organization, I will waive your disabilities." In September 1979, Norris passed the test and subsequently was an FBI Special Agent for 20 years. He was an original member of the FBI's Hostage Rescue Team as an assault team leader. He is a member of the Society of Former Special Agents of the Federal Bureau of Investigation.

== Honors and citations ==
=== Medal of Honor citation ===
Citation:

For conspicuous gallantry and intrepidity in action at the risk of his life above and beyond the call of duty while serving as a SEAL Advisor with the Strategic Technical Directorate Assistance Team, Headquarters, U.S. Military Assistance Command, Vietnam. During the period 10 to 13 April 1972, Lieutenant Norris completed an unprecedented ground rescue of two downed pilots deep within heavily controlled enemy territory in Quang Tri Province. Lieutenant Norris, on the night of 10 April, led a five-man patrol through 2,000 meters of heavily controlled enemy territory, located one of the downed pilots at daybreak, and returned to the Forward Operating Base (FOB). On 11 April, after a devastating mortar and rocket attack on the small FOB, Lieutenant Norris led a three man team on two unsuccessful rescue attempts for the second pilot. On the afternoon of the 12th, a Forward Air Controller located the pilot and notified Lieutenant Norris. Dressed in fishermen disguises and using a sampan, Lieutenant Norris and one Vietnamese traveled throughout that night and found the injured pilot at dawn. Covering the pilot with bamboo and vegetation, they began the return journey, successfully evading a North Vietnamese patrol. Approaching the FOB, they came under heavy machine gun fire. Lieutenant Norris called in an air strike which provided suppression fire and a smoke screen, allowing the rescue party to reach the FOB. By his outstanding display of decisive leadership, undaunted courage, and selfless dedication in the face of extreme danger, Lieutenant Norris enhanced the finest traditions of the United States Naval Service.

=== Awards and achievements ===
The Naval Special Warfare Group Two's Lt. Thomas R. Norris Building in Little Creek, Virginia is named in his honor.

Norris' Medal of Honor actions have been re-told in numerous books and in the feature film Bat*21, which was the call sign for an EB-66C from the 42nd Tactical Electronic Warfare Squadron (42 TEWS), 388th Tactical Fighter Wing, at Korat, Thailand. The aircraft was shot down while flying pathfinder escort for a cell of three B-52 bombing near the Demilitarized Zone.

Norris received the Distinguished Eagle Scout Award in 2011. He is one of eleven Eagle Scouts to have been awarded the Medal of Honor.

In 1976, he received the Golden Plate Award of the American Academy of Achievement.

=== Military awards ===
Norris' military decorations and awards include the following:

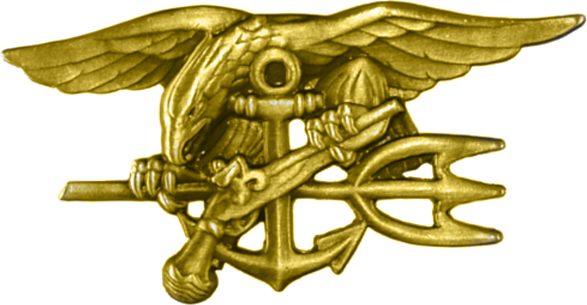

Special Warfare insignia
1st Row	Medal of Honor	Silver Star	Bronze Star Medal w/ Combat "V" and two 3/16" Gold Stars	Purple Heart
2nd Row	Joint Service Commendation Medal	Navy Commendation Medal w/ Combat "V"	Combat Action Ribbon	Navy Presidential Unit Citation w/ 3/16" bronze star
3rd Row	Navy Unit Commendation	Navy Meritorious Unit Commendation	National Defense Service Medal	Vietnam Service Medal w/ three 3/16" bronze stars
4th Row	Vietnam Gallantry Cross w/ Gold Star	Vietnam Armed Forces Honor Medal 2nd class	Vietnam Staff Service Medal 2nd class	Republic of Vietnam Meritorious Unit Citation (Gallantry Cross) with palm and frame
5th Row	Republic of Vietnam Meritorious Unit Citation (Civil Actions) with palm and frame	Republic of Vietnam Campaign Medal w/ 1960– device	Navy Expert Rifleman Medal	Navy Expert Pistol Shot Medal
Navy and Marine Corps Parachutist insignia

== Bibliography ==
- By Honor Bound: Two Navy SEALs, the Medal of Honor, and a Story of Extraordinary Courage. St. Martin's Press. 2016. ISBN 978-1250070593. Written with Mike Thornton and Dick Couch.

== See also ==
- MACV-SOG
- List of Eagle Scouts
- List of Medal of Honor recipients for the Vietnam War
