= Rescue of Bat 21 Bravo =

Vietnam War event

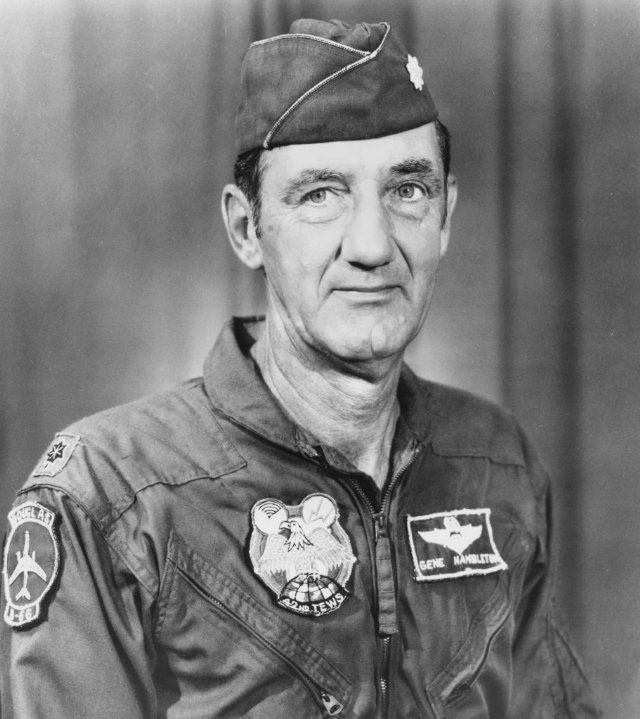
Lt. Col. Iceal Hambleton, whose call sign was Bat 21 Bravo, c. 1973

The rescue of Bat 21 Bravo, the call sign for Iceal "Gene" Hambleton (a navigator aboard an EB-66C aircraft shot down behind North Vietnamese lines), was the "largest, longest, and most complex search-and-rescue" operation during the Vietnam War. Five additional aircraft were shot down during rescue attempts, directly resulting in the deaths of 11 airmen, the capture of two others, and another airman trying to evade capture.

On 2 April 1972, the Easter Offensive, the largest combined arms operation of the entire Vietnam War, was in its third day. An early morning flight of two United States Air Force EB-66C aircraft was led by Bat 20. Hambleton was a navigator aboard Bat 21. The two aircraft were escorting a cell of three B-52s. Bat 21 was configured to gather signals intelligence, including identifying North Vietnamese anti-aircraft radar installations to enable jamming. Bat 21 was destroyed by an SA-2 surface-to-air missile (SAM) and Hambleton was the only survivor, parachuting behind the front lines into a battlefield filled with thousands of People's Army of Vietnam (PAVN) soldiers.

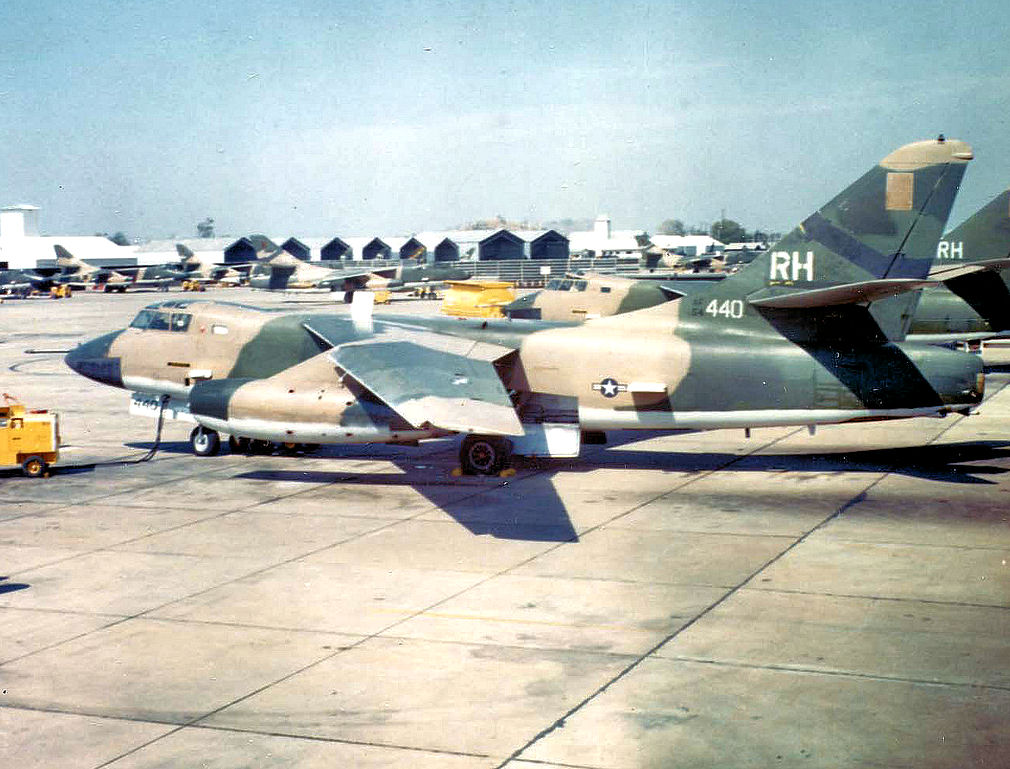
A 42nd TEWS Douglas EB-66E Destroyer at Takhli, Thailand.

Hambleton had Top Secret access to Strategic Air Command operations and was an expert in SAM countermeasures. The PAVN may have possessed information about his presence in Vietnam and his capture would have meant a huge intelligence bonanza for the Soviet Union.

Hambleton and 1st Lt. Mark Clark, who was shot down during rescue operations, were recovered from behind the front lines on two different nights in covert, night-time rescues carried out by U.S. Navy SEAL Thomas R. Norris and Republic of Vietnam Navy (RVNN) commandos. For their actions in rescuing the two men, Norris was awarded the Medal of Honor and RVNN Petty Officer Nguyễn Văn Kiệt was recognized with the Navy Cross. Nguyen was the only South Vietnamese sailor given that award during the war.

The Air Force did not put limits on what it took to rescue a downed airman. The direct and indirect cost of rescuing Hambleton was enormous and became a watershed event in Air Force search and rescue. To prevent friendly fire incidents, the Americans imposed a standard no-fire zone within a 27 kilometres (17 mi) radius of Hambleton and diverted aircraft to aid in his rescue. In addition to the direct casualties caused by the rescue mission, it is likely that South Vietnamese soldiers indirectly died as a result of their inability to obtain fire support.

The added deaths, loss of aircraft, and length of the rescue operation led the USAF to change the way they planned and conducted search and rescue missions. As a result, they developed new techniques and equipment to improve their ability to rescue downed airmen.

== Operational background ==
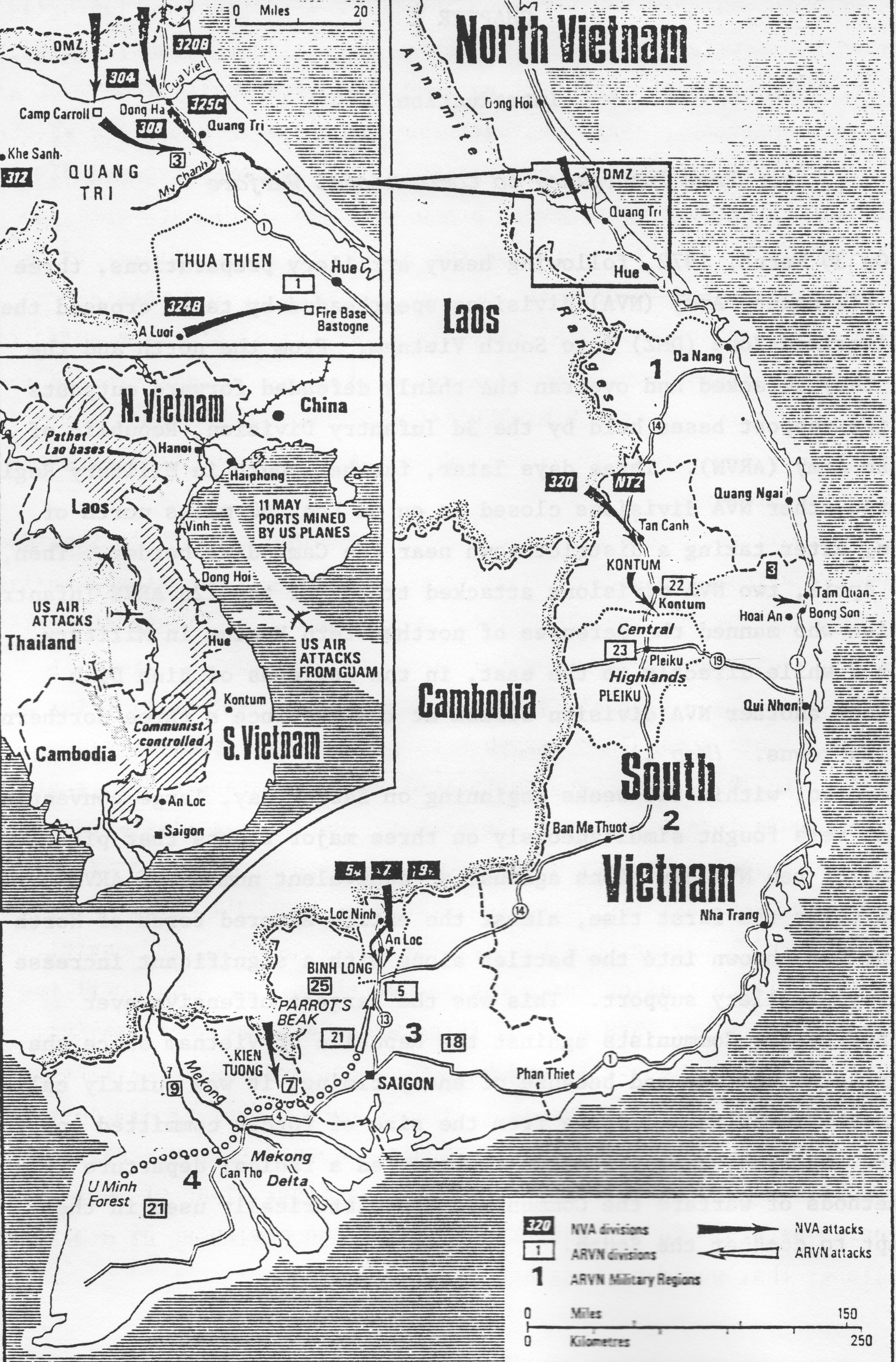
The Easter or Nguyen Hue Offensive of 1972

At the time of Bat 21's mission, American combat forces had been vastly reduced in South Vietnam under President Richard Nixon's Vietnamization policy. The PAVN launched the Nguyen Hue Offensive against the Army of the Republic of Vietnam (ARVN) and U.S. military on Friday, 30 March 1972. It was their largest attack of the war and was timed to take full advantage of the bad weather typical during monsoon season, offering low clouds and poor visibility. About 30,000 heavily equipped PAVN troops from the 304th and 308th Divisions and three separate infantry regiments of the B5 Front crossed the Vietnamese Demilitarized Zone (DMZ) into I Corps zone across the five northernmost provinces of South Vietnam.

In the 8 kilometres (5.0 mi) area between the Cam Lộ Bridge and Dong Ha Bridge, the PAVN were supported by two tank regiments of 150 Soviet T-54 and PT-76 tanks, 75 tracked anti-aircraft vehicles, an artillery regiment of 47 towed 130mm guns and the largest concentration of anti-aircraft weaponry of the entire war, including the advanced SA-2 SAM. Their main line of advance was along the axis of the north–south national highway QL-1.

When Military Assistance Command, Vietnam (MACV) headquarters in Saigon learned of large PAVN movement south of the DMZ, a number of B-52s had been sent on Arc Light missions without escort, but were experiencing significantly increased SAM activity. The 42nd Tactical Electronic Warfare Squadron (42 TEWS) was tapped for assistance. The draw down of US forces had left the unit shorthanded and Hambleton was the senior officer among a group of senior navigators.

Hambleton assigned himself as navigator on the older EB-66C, which was configured to gather signals intelligence. The newer EB-66E was tasked with jamming SAM radar guidance systems so their missiles could not accurately target the aircraft. The EB-66's mission was to trawl for missiles, let them lock on to their aircraft, and then execute a SAM break, a violent turn and dive designed to throw off the pursuing missile. The SA-2 was the size of a telephone pole and carried a proximity fused warhead that was lethal within about 150 feet (46 m). Their guidance systems failed at about 2 Gs, while the EB-66 could achieve 5 Gs in its avoidance maneuver. The crew had successfully pulled a SAM break more than 100 times. The presence of North Vietnamese SAMs south of the DMZ had been tracked by Hambleton, but not everyone agreed they were present that far south.

== Aircraft shot down ==
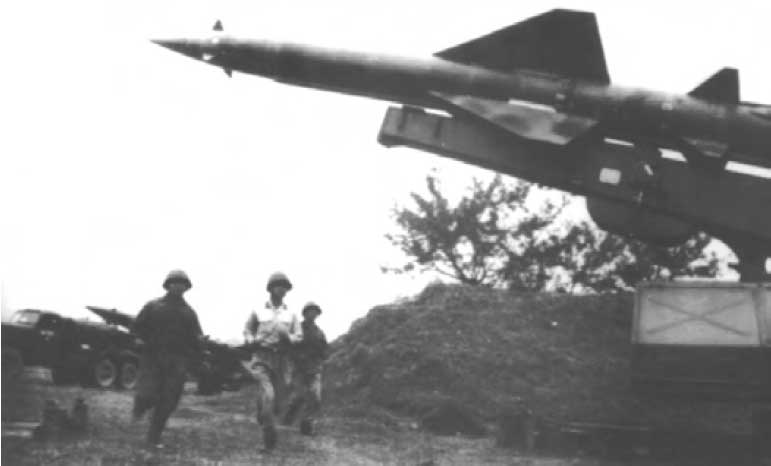
North Vietnamese personnel scramble to ready an SA-2 missile to engage American aircraft.

On Easter Sunday, 2 April 1972, two six-seat EB-66s (call signs Bat 21 and Bat 22) were flying pathfinder escort for a cell of three B-52s, which were given assignments to bomb Mu Gia or the Ban Karai Pass, the two primary access routes to the Ho Chi Minh Trail through Laos.

Hambleton was aboard Bat 21, EB-66C serial number 54-0466, over Quảng Trị Province, South Vietnam, just south of the DMZ. The airmen were surprised by the intensity of the anti-aircraft fire and SAM activity. The PAVN 365th Air Defense Division fired two volleys of SA-2 SAMs at the U.S. planes, but the EB-66s successfully thwarted the first volley. The PAVN pointed their Fan Song radar at the B-52s, targeting them unsuccessfully with radar guided anti-aircraft fire. When those missed, the PAVN fired two more SAMs optically at Bat 21, only turning on the guidance and radar system after the missiles were launched, which delayed the targeted aircraft's ability to detect and avoid them.

When the aircraft crew spotted the missiles, the pilot assumed they had as usual been fired from north of the DMZ. He began a SAM break to the south, away from the direction he assumed the missiles had been fired. One of the EWOs called "Negative! Negative!", and the pilot flipped the plane over on its other wing. This time the pilot was unable to evade the missiles. The first missile exploded immediately beneath the aircraft striking it at 29,000 feet (8,800 m).

Hambleton, whose call sign was Bat 21 Bravo, was the mission navigator and automatically set to be the first to eject in the event of an emergency. He was positioned immediately behind the pilot, who gave the signal for everyone to eject. Hambleton pulled the ejection seat handles and made eye contact with the pilot as his seat rocketed out of the dying plane. A moment later, the aircraft was struck by a second SA-2 and exploded. The remainder of the aircraft's six-man crew—Major Wayne L. Bolte, pilot; 1st Lieutenant Robin F. Gatwood, co-pilot; and EWOs Lieutenant Colonel Anthony R. Giannangeli, Lieutenant Colonel Charles A. Levis and Major Henry M. Serex—were unable to eject and they remain listed as missing in action.

Hambleton was due for some R&R, and his wife Gwen was planning to meet him in Thailand the next week. She received airplane tickets for her trip on the same day that her husband was shot down. Instead of going to the airport, she collapsed after seeing an Air Force officer and a chaplain walk up her sidewalk.

=== Surrounded by North Vietnamese ===
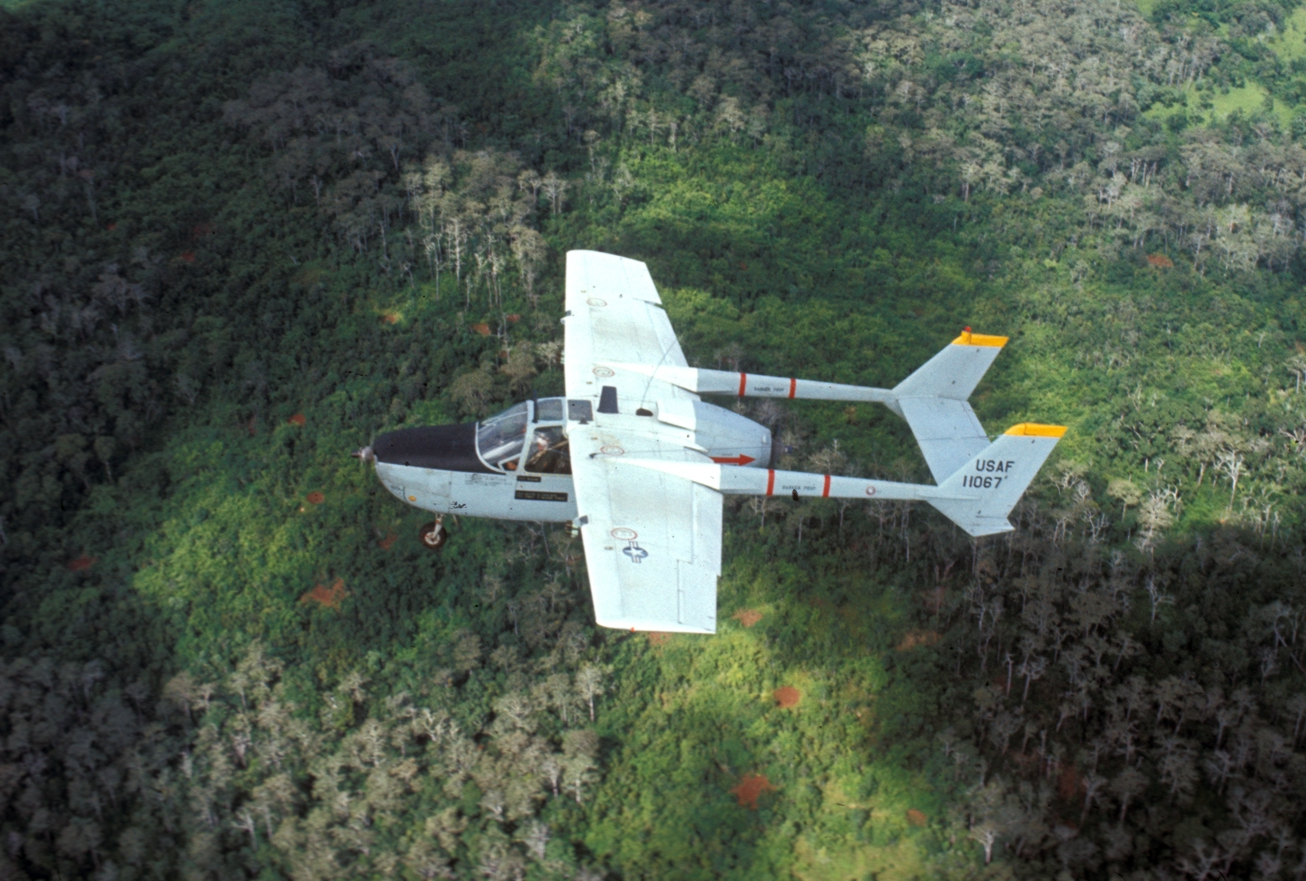
An O-2A Skymaster over Laos, 1970.

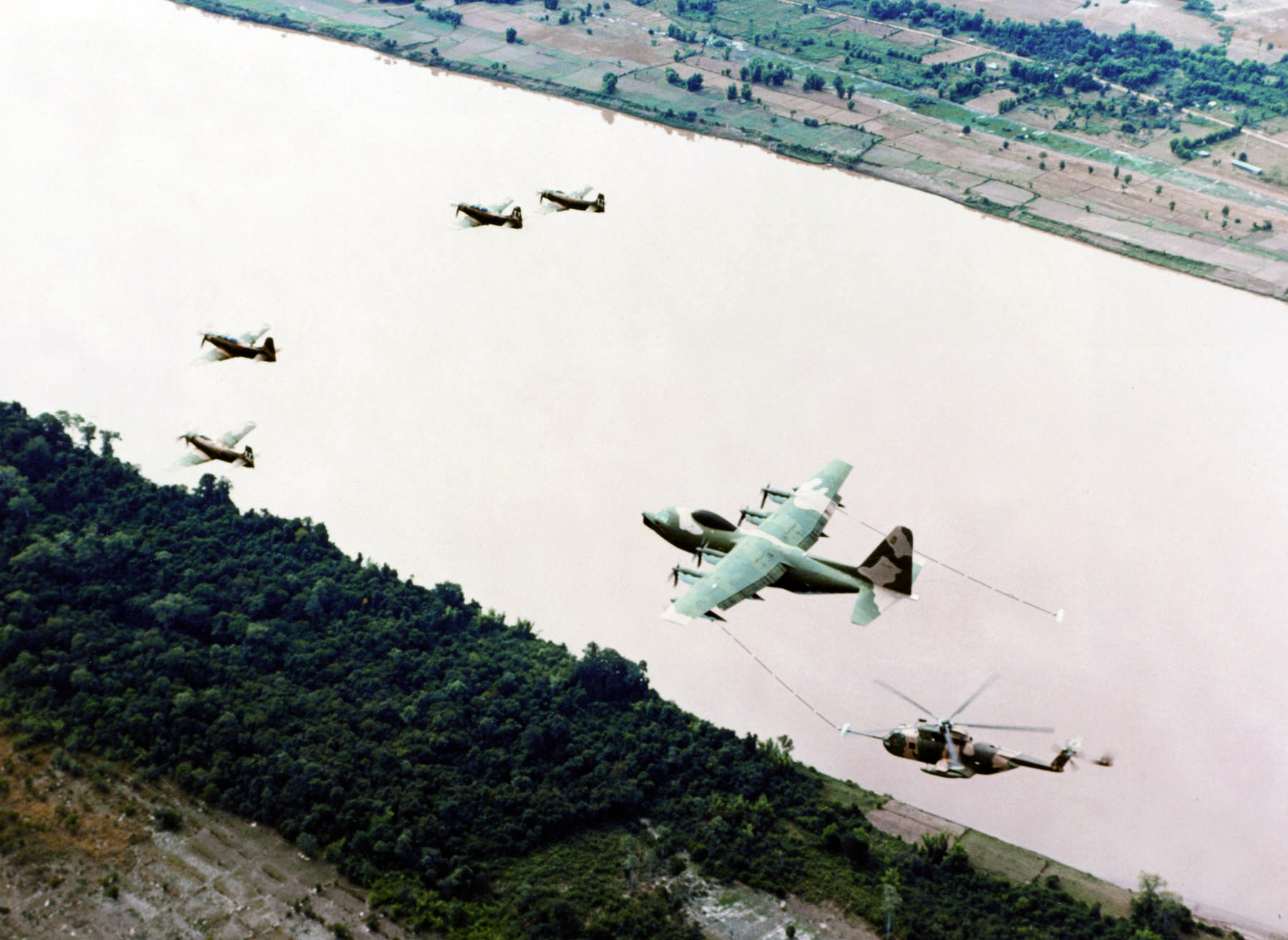
A Lockheed HC-130P Hercules recovery aircraft refueling a Sikorsky HH-3E Jolly Green Giant helicopter, accompanied by four Douglas A-1E and A-1H/J Skyraider from the 602nd Special Operations Squadron.

Maj. Jimmy D. Kempton from the 390th Tactical Fighter Squadron was leading a flight of four F-4 Phantoms on a bombing mission when he got SAM warnings. He saw four SA-2 missiles emerge from the clouds about 2 miles (3.2 km) ahead of him and saw one strike Bat 21. At a lower altitude, 1st Lt. Bill Jankowski and Capt. Lyle Wilson in an O-2 (Bilk 34) forward air controller (FAC) aircraft saw Bat 21 explode.

Hambleton parachuted into the middle of more than 30,000 troops pouring across the border into South Vietnam. When Hambleton's URC-64 rescue radio beeped, Jankowski responded, and was surprised to learn that Hambleton was above him descending in his parachute. Jankowski followed Hambleton down. Hambleton was concealed by a low fog bank as he landed in a dry rice paddy, unseen by the PAVN troops.

As Jankowski observed Hambleton land, his aircraft came under heavy antiaircraft fire. He was astonished at the huge number of PAVN troops, equipment, and heavy weapons in the area. Hambleton found refuge in a group of bushes in the middle of the rice paddy. PAVN troops were less than 100 metres (330 ft) away. Jankowski fixed Hambleton's location 2 kilometres (1.2 mi) north of the Cam Lo Bridge and just north of TL-88, a major east–west secondary road.

Kempton and Jankowski relayed Hambleton's coordinates to King 22, a HC-130 search and rescue (SAR) aircraft operating just south of Quảng Trị. Recovering Hambleton quickly was essential, as the odds of recovering downed airmen dropped below twenty percent if the aircrew member was on the ground after four hours. But their efforts would be severely hampered by the huge number of troops and large quantity of anti-aircraft fire in the area, some of it supporting the PAVN's efforts to capture and protect the Cam Lo Bridge near Hambleton's position.

At about the same time that Hambleton was shot down, Capt. John Ripley, adviser to the Vietnamese 3rd Marine Battalion, blew up the key Highway QL-1 bridge over the Cua Viet River, east of Hambleton's position, at Đông Hà. The PAVN re-routed thousands of troops, dozens of tanks and other equipment west along TL-88, immediately in front of Hambleton's position, to the Cam Lo River bridge 8 kilometres (5.0 mi) to the west.

=== Intelligence value ===
Hambleton had more than 20 years of military service. He had served in the Army Air Force as a radio operator during World War II, though not in combat. After World War II, he was recalled to active service by the USAF in the early 1950s. During the Korean War he flew 43 combat missions as a navigator in a B-29 bomber. He then worked during the 1960s on various USAF ballistic missile projects including the PGM-19 Jupiter, Titan I ICBM and Titan II ICBM. He had been the deputy chief of operations for the USAF Strategic Air Command 390th Strategic Missile Wing before the Vietnam War.

In April 1972 he was reassigned from the SAC to TAC and to the 42nd TEWS, 388th Tactical Fighter Wing, at Korat, Thailand. He was familiar with targeting both SAC missiles and SAC airplanes, was one of the most knowledgeable missile and electronic counter-measures experts in Vietnam, and it is likely that his situation was quickly reported to U.S. intelligence services. Very few Americans remained on the ground in Vietnam, and the PAVN made it a point to track particularly valuable personnel, even in Thailand.

The North Vietnamese were probably supported by the Russians with decrypting American message traffic and they likely knew exactly who had parachuted into their midst. This ability was likely enabled by the then unknown American spy CWO John Anthony Walker, who had given the Soviets a radio cipher card and other high-value intelligence. Hambleton's capture would be a terrific blow to American airpower around the world and a huge prize for the North Vietnamese and indirectly, the Soviets. Hambleton said after the war that he felt sure if he were captured that he would never have been taken to Hanoi.

== Air rescue attempts ==
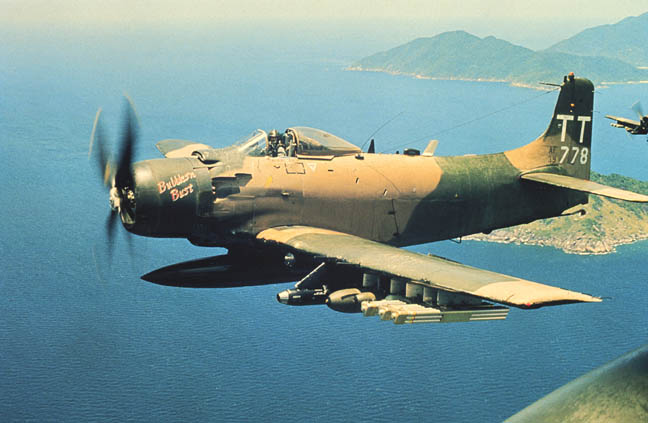
An A-1H from the 602nd SOS, 1970.

Hambleton had received water survival training at Turkey Run, Florida, and escape and evasion training and survival basics at the Pacific Air Command Jungle Survival School in the Philippines.

He had shrapnel wounds from his aircraft exploding, a ripped finger, and four compressed vertebra from the force of the ejection. Hidden in a clump of trees in his hole, surrounded by North Vietnamese less than 100 metres (330 ft) away, Hambleton decided that with only nine months to go until his retirement, he was going to survive and return home.

1st Lt. Richard Abbot, flying a FAC O-2, had been shot down offshore shortly before Hambleton. When Abbot was picked up by the USS Hamner, two Air Force search and rescue Douglas A-1 Skyraiders (Capt. Don Morse in Sandy 07, and his wingman in Sandy 08) from the 1st Special Operations Squadron remained in Hambleton's vicinity. The Sandys immediately scrambled to cover Hambleton's position. When Captain Morse in Sandy 07 first got the call, he thought that, because the aircraft had gone down in South Vietnam, the SAR effort could be accomplished fairly quickly.

When he got over Hambleton's position, he was shocked at the amount of ground fire he received. It was more intense than anything he had seen in the war. Some pilots reported that the intensity of the antiaircraft fire was equal to that around Hanoi. Although the U.S. and ARVN forces did not know it yet, the offensive was the largest combined arms attack conducted by the North Vietnamese during the war.

Hambleton coolly relayed the coordinates of the North Vietnamese around him, watched the ordnance explode, and directed corrections to the FAC above, who relayed the information to the A-1s and the F-4 Phantom fighter-bombers. FAC pilots after the event were universally amazed at Hambleton's ability to remain calm and direct accurate fire around his position.

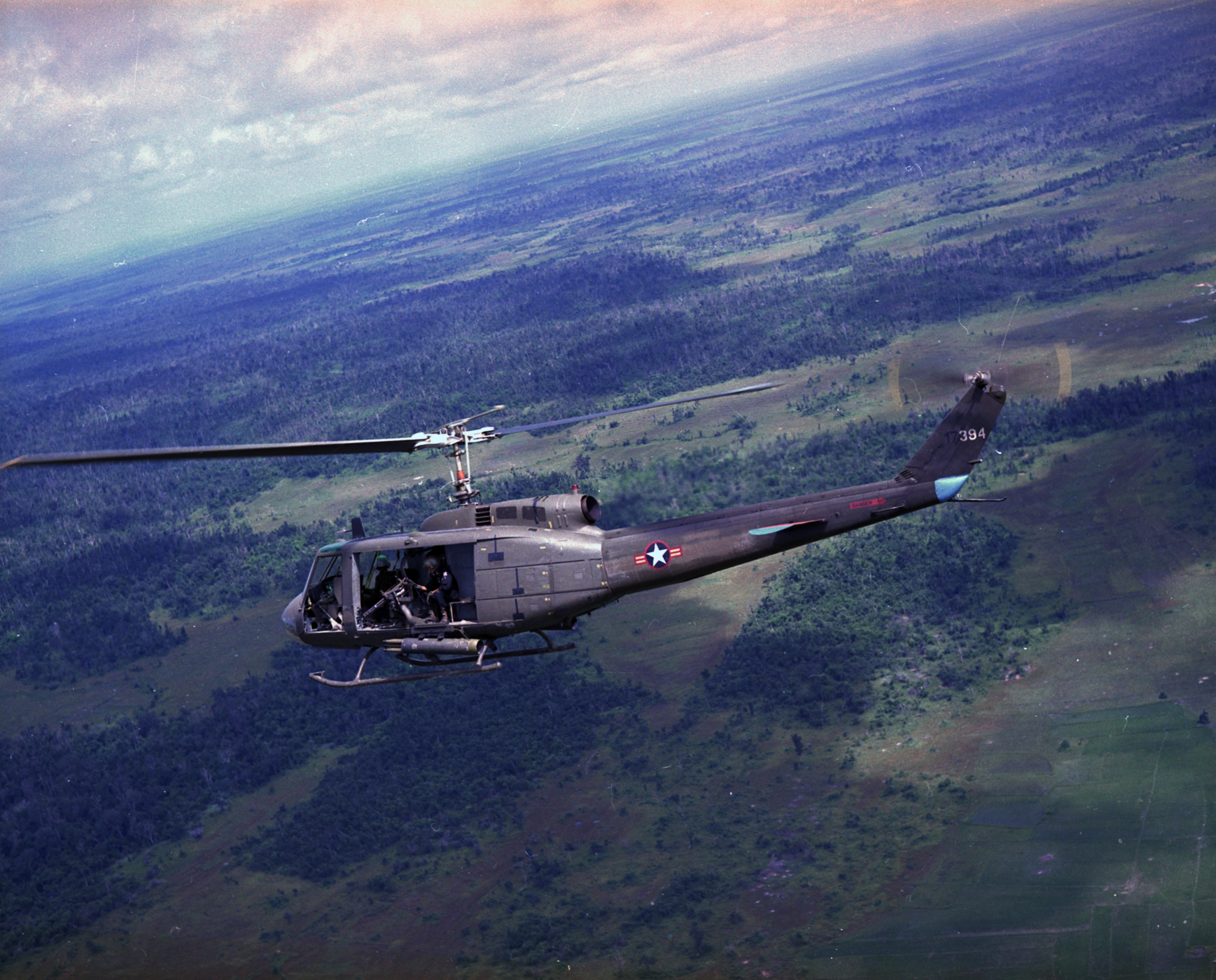
RVNAF UH-1H during a combat mission in Southeast Asia, 1971.

Morse called for emergency support, which was picked up by a UH-1H (Blue Ghost 39) near Huế, piloted by 1st Lt. Byron Kulland from F Troop, 8th Cavalry, 196th Brigade. Normally based at Marble Mountain Air Facility near Da Nang, Kulland was in the area showing a photographer the developing battle. He had on board with him Capt. Thomas White, the Troop operations officer. After depositing the photographer and White at Phu Bai Combat Base, White directed Kulland to proceed north and contact the FAC (Jankowski) for information on arrival. White also sent two AH-1G Cobra gunships, Blue Ghost 28 and 24, and then added Blue Ghost 30, a second UH-1.

Blue Ghost 39 proceeded across the Mieu Giang River 50 feet (15 m) above the ground towards Hambleton's position with the Blue Ghost 28 Cobra gunship following about 3,000 feet (910 m) behind and 300 feet (91 m) above. Blue Ghost 24 waited at the south side of the Mieu Giang River for Blue Ghost 30 to catch up. As soon as Blue Ghost 39 and 28 crossed the Mieu Giang River they were met by an immediate curtain of North Vietnamese fire from every direction, hurled against them with a strong intensity. Rosebeary in Blue Ghost 28 responded with rockets and 40mm fire, but both helicopters were struck multiple times.

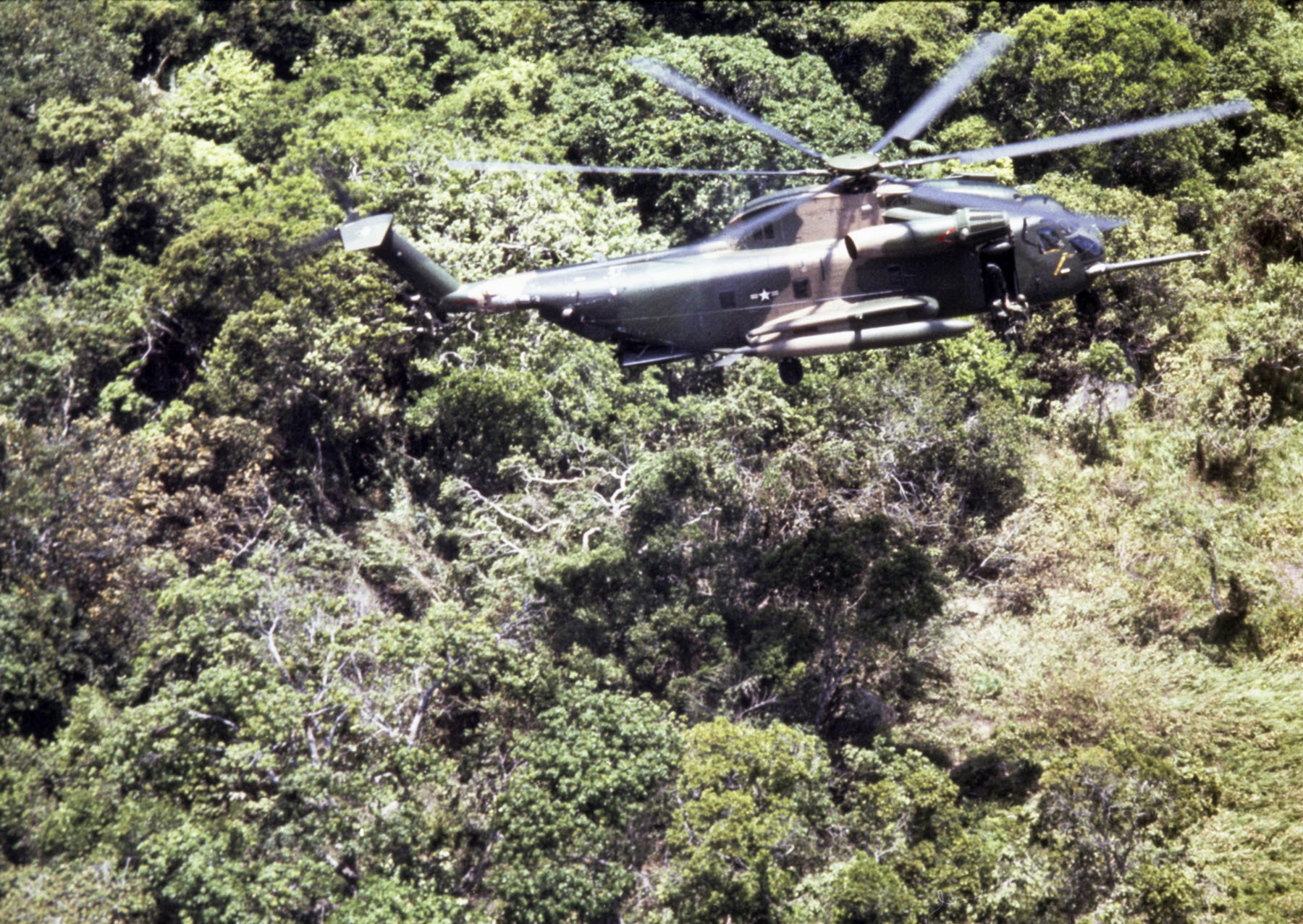
A Sikorsky HH-53C during a rescue mission over Southeast Asia

Kulland flying Blue Ghost 39 tried to turn back south but only managed to crash-land his stricken aircraft, about 6.7 kilometres (4.2 mi) east of Hambleton and 0.9 miles (1.4 km) north of the river in an area full of PAVN. When the helicopter smashed into the ground, the only mobile crew member was SP5 Jose Astorga, the door gunner, who had been wounded. He tried but was unable to extract other hurt crew members. SP5 Ronald Paschall was pinned in the wreckage. WO John Frink, who was seriously wounded, urged Astorga to get out and away from the aircraft. A few moments later advancing PAVN soldiers fired on the wreckage with automatic weapons and the aircraft's fuel tank exploded with the remainder of the crew inside. Astorga was captured, but pilots Kulland and Frink, along with Paschall, were killed.

Rosebeary, flying Cobra Blue Ghost 28, called a Mayday but was able to safely exit the area and landed his severely damaged helicopter. His aircraft was totaled. He and Gunner Warrant Officer Charles Gorski were picked up by a HH-53C helicopter (Jolly Green 67), without incident. Rosebeary warned other aircraft against crossing the river. When Morse in Sandy 07 learned that the quick-snatch had failed, he and his wingman Sandy 08 broke off engaging the North Vietnamese and returned to Da Nang. Both Sandys were found to be so damaged they would take several days to repair.

At 21:00, Nail 59, a new version of the OV-10A Bronco aircraft equipped with the Pave Nail LORAN radar took over FAC duties. The SAR efforts were suspended for the night and the U.S. and ARVN forces remained unaware of the true strength of the PAVN offensive. Advised by the FAC to remain in place, Hambleton moved to a safer spot in the jungle and dug a hole to hide in until morning. During the night, Nail 59 and King 27, an HC-130 stayed. They suddenly found themselves painted by Fan Song radar and narrowly missed getting shot down as well. At 53 years old, Hambleton was not a prime candidate to survive the cold, wet weather conditions.

=== No fire zone ===
The Joint Search and Rescue Command (JSARC) was under the direction of the director of aerospace rescue, Colonel Cecil Muirhead, who could restrict airspace activity for the use of search and rescue forces. He also commanded all the dedicated assets needed to assist with SAR. Muirhead ordered 24-hour FAC coverage around Hambleton's position to watch over him and soften up the North Vietnamese positions around him.

To protect the downed airmen and the search and rescue forces, Muirhead also ordered the 7th Air Force to establish a standard 27 kilometres (17 mi) no-fire zone around Hambleton. It prohibited friendly artillery, naval gunfire, or aircraft from engaging any target in the zone without JSARC approval. Three North Vietnamese divisions were attacking and the ARVN 3rd Division could not reply for several hours with artillery or request tactical air strikes in the area.

=== More aircraft lost ===
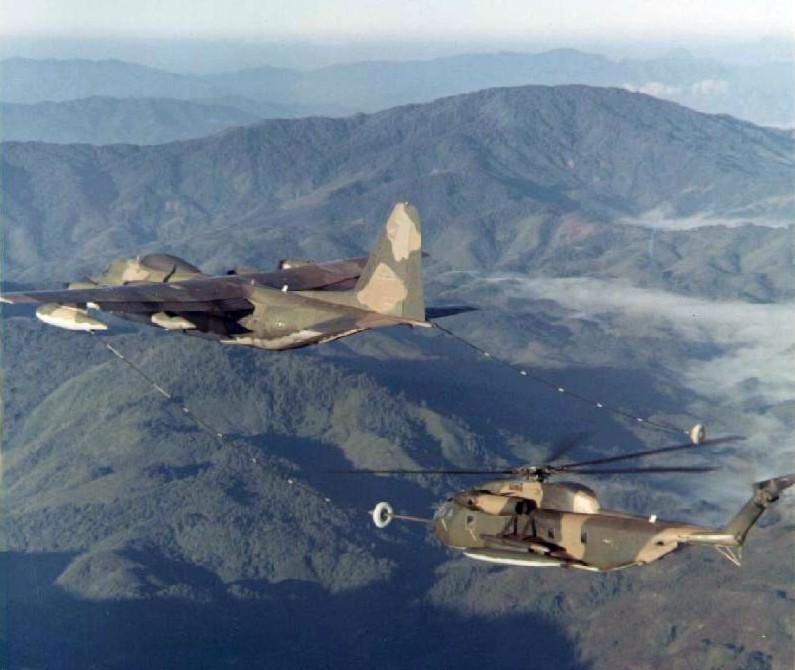
A HH-53B of the 40th Aerospace Rescue and Recovery Squadron refueling from a HC-130P over North Vietnam, 1969–70.

On 3 April, air search and rescue forces attempted a first light rescue, which can successfully achieve surprise with minimal force. A search and rescue crew took off from the 37th AARS based at Nakhon Phanom, Thailand. It consisted of two HH-53 rescue helicopters, Jolly Green 65 and 67, and two A-1 Skyraiders, Sandy 07 and 08. Sandy 05 and 06 joined them on the scene. The area was covered in a solid overcast, preventing visual control of air strikes by the on-scene OV-10A FAC, Nail 25 which nevertheless coordinated the work of several F-4s who were directed to drop CBU-42 anti-personnel cluster bombs around Hambleton to help protect his position. When Nail 25 ran low on fuel, it was replaced by an OV-10 (Nail 38) from the 23rd TASS flown by Captain William J. Henderson and 1st Lieutenant Mark Clark.

The PAVN had a listening post in the area and overheard the American radio traffic. They were very familiar with American SAR tactics and on the second day they began to use the downed flyer as bait. They positioned a number of anti-aircraft gun and SAMs in the area near Hambleton. One pilot reported that "SAM calls were driving us into the small arms threat. Ground fire was accurate and well disciplined ... The [PAVN] were very definitely monitoring and jamming our communications."

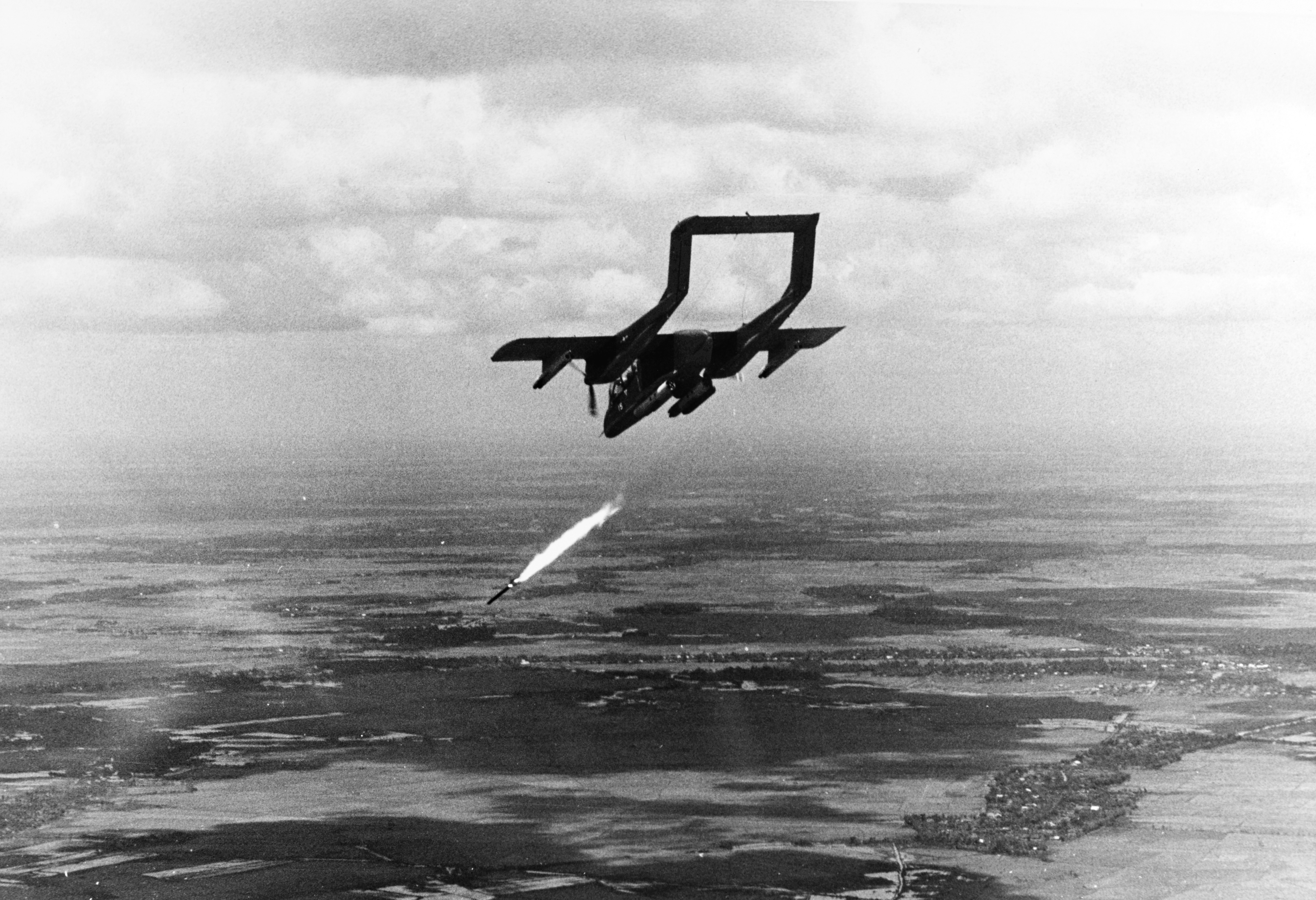
A U.S. Navy OV-10A Bronco from light attack squadron VAL-4 Black Ponies attacks a target with a 5 inches (130 mm) "Zuni" rocket in the Mekong Delta, South Vietnam, c. 1969/70.

Henderson obtained LORAN fixes on Hambleton's position. Coast Guard Lt. Commander Jay Crowe, an exchange pilot on assignment to the 37th ARRS at Da Nang, was piloting Jolly Green 65. The helicopter broke through the clouds and rapidly dropped into the area where Hambleton was hidden. The aircraft was immediately struck by a wall of North Vietnamese gunfire. Their rounds tore through the aircraft, destroying the instrument panel. Crowe struggled to get the aircraft out of the fire zone, and with his instruments shot up, he had to rely on external visual cues to fly the aircraft. He nursed the helicopter south and was able to get to the Phu Bai. Jolly Green 66 flown by Lt. Colonel Bill Harris followed, only to break through the low ceiling to face ten North Vietnamese tanks and a withering onslaught of ground fire. He fought the controls to bring his rescue helicopter within 100 yards (91 m) of Hambleton, his gunners firing the airship's three GAU-2/A 7.62 mm miniguns, engaging the North Vietnamese on every side. A pilot flying support, looking for targets to engage, asked, "Where's the enemy fire coming from?" Harris replied, "From everywhere!" Harris managed to get his badly damaged aircraft to gain altitude, then limp back to safety.

Forced to fly in and out of cloud cover at perilously low altitudes, FAC Nail 38, (Note: FACs from Da Nang Air Base used the call signs Covey and Bilk, while aircraft from Nakhon Phanom used Nail.) piloted by Henderson was hit by North Vietnamese fire and shot down. Henderson landed on the north side of the Mieu Giang River, about 500 metres (1,600 ft) from Hambleton. He hid in a bamboo patch until local villagers came looking for him and cut it down. He was taken north and became a POW. Clark parachuted to the ground safely on the south side of river and eluded capture. Later that same day, another UH-1H, unrelated to the rescue operation, was shot down in the same area carrying a crew of four. After pinpointing Hambleton's location, the Air Force bombarded the area around him for the next three days. On 4 April, a flight of ten A-1 Skyraiders, half the total available in all of South Vietnam, attempted to pave the way for a SAR team, and it was badly shot up. Eight of the ten aircraft were damaged, two severely. The damage significantly affected the availability of the Skyraiders. At dusk, Major Jimmy D. Kempton flying F-4D 66-0265 with the 390th TFS and a wingman entered from the coast under a descending 500 feet (150 m) ceiling and dropped BLU-52 SAR ordnance on four sides of Hambleton's location, the last of SAR ordnance on 4 April. (Note: As noted in Kempton's flight log book and in his citation for the Distinguished Flying Cross he was awarded for that day.)

On 5 April, bad weather prevented any SAR activity.

On 6 April at 15:15, a third attempt was made to pick Hambleton and now Clark up. Four A-1 Skyraiders (Sandys 01, 02, 05 and 06) prepared the area around the survivors with extensive bombing and strafing. They were assisted by two HH-53Cs (Jolly Green 67 and Jolly Green 60) from the 37th ARRS. During the day American fighters flew 52 sorties and four B-52 bombers bombed the area around Cam Lo.

On 6 April 80 SAMs were launched by the PAVN in the area around Hambleton. It was estimated that Hambleton and Clark were in the midst of five or six PAVN battalions. The PAVN air defense seriously challenged American air superiority and blunted the success of close air support in the area.

Capt. Peter Chapman volunteered to pilot Jolly Green 67, despite the fact that he was due to return home very soon. Capt. Boli in Sandy 01 decided they would pick up Hambleton first and Clark immediately after. At 17:10, Sandy 03 joined the group with a full load of white phosphorus that could be used to lay down a smoke screen. Sandy 01 called in additional strikes on targets around Hambleton's position and re-checked the area. North Vietnamese response was limited. Aware that it could be a trap, he nonetheless gave the go-ahead.

As Jolly Green 67 crossed the Mieu Giang River with Jolly Green 60 high and above guarding their approach, Jolly Green 67 began taking fire from all sides. As it approached Hambleton's position, they called for him to pop his smoke and reveal his position. The aircraft was pummeled with automatic weapons and anti-aircraft fire from all quarters. Hambleton hesitated, and the Jolly Green tried to pull away. Despite the best efforts of the remaining aircraft, Jolly Green 67 was critically damaged. Jolly Green 67 flew east at first, further into territory held by the North Vietnamese, before it turned southeast for a few kilometers, when a fire broke out in the left engine. Pieces of the tail rotor struck the main rotor, and the aircraft rolled and crashed on its left side, burning ferociously. No rescue beepers were heard. The entire crew was listed as MIA and presumed killed: Capt. Peter Hayden Chapman II (pilot), Capt. John Henry Call III (co-pilot), TSgt. William Roy Pearson, TSgt. Allen J. Avery (para-rescuemen), TSgt. Roy D. Prater (crew chief), and Sgt. James Harold Alley (combat photographer). The fire consuming the helicopter was so hot it melted parts of the aircraft and continued to burn for three more days. The helicopter crashed about 300 yards (270 m) from where Hambleton was hiding.

Hambleton's and Clark's spirits sank when they realized that six men died while attempting to rescue them. Hambleton considered surrendering. The new on-scene commander in charge of the entire rescue mission, Capt. John Van Etten, was flying an F-4 out of Da Nang (call sign Nail 32). He reminded Hambleton that people had died while attempting to rescue him and it'd be a waste if he stood up and was taken prisoner. Hambleton decided, "Hell, I'm going to get out of this, regardless." He camouflaged his hole, hiding there for seven nights and six days. He left the hole twice to scavenge for food and was almost caught the second time when he was spotted by a boy and his dog. PAVN soldiers searching for him passed within 20 feet (6.1 m) of his hole twice.

The SAR task force mission leader, Capt. Fred Boli in Sandy 01, called the rescue off for the time being because it was too dangerous. The remaining aircraft exited to the south across the Mieu Giang River. Hambleton and Clark would have to spend another night behind the front lines. The North Vietnamese, alerted by the American's intense efforts to find the navigator, increased their efforts to find Hambleton.

=== PAVN strength prevents air rescue ===
All of the SAR teams were experienced in conducting rescues into what they described as "hot LZs", but the airmen were shocked by the quantity and intensity of the ground and anti-aircraft fire they had faced since the rescue attempt began. This included not only small arms fire and the previously used 23mm, 37mm and 57mm towed guns, but the 85mm and 100mm towed guns, along with the self-propelled, radar-guided ZSU-57-2 AAA gun. Most surprising to the Americans were the large presence of SA-2 SAMs, and for the first time the use of the Soviet SA-7 Grail shoulder-fired, heat-seeking SAM.

37th ARRS commander Lt. Col. Bill Harris was upset. He concluded that the air rescue could not be attempted at that time due to the heavy concentration of North Vietnamese forces in the immediate area around Clark and Hambleton. He called Muirhead and told him that they had to find another way. Hambleton was told to sit tight while they worked up an alternative plan. Hambleton had two survival radios, a first aid kit, two kinds of flares, a knife and a .38 caliber revolver, a compass and a map, an empty water bottle, but no food.

On the morning of 7 April, 1st Lt. Bruce C. Walker accompanied by naval artillery spotter Marine Lt. Larry F. Potts were flying an OV-10A (Covey 282) from 20th Tactical Air Support Squadron. Potts was directing naval gunfire from the destroyer USS Buchanan against North Vietnamese tanks to protect Hambleton. At 11:05, an O-1 Bird Dog pilot observed a SAM launch and Covey 282 was shot down 3 miles (4.8 km) west of Highway 1 and 4 miles (6.4 km) north of Highway 9. Radio contact was established with both Potts and Walker, and both reported that they were uninjured, but each man was too close to North Vietnamese forces to attempt a rescue.

Clark hid on the south side of the Mieu Giang River, while Walker was about 6 kilometres (3.7 mi) north of Hambleton, who was on the north side of the river about 2 kilometres (1.2 mi) from the town of Cam Lo. Clark evaded capture for a number of days and was in contact with SAR personnel when he warned them away due to the proximity of PAVN forces.

The U.S. rescuers knew that the North Vietnamese were monitoring radio communications and understood English. Clark and Hambleton were several miles apart. A FAC told Clark, who was from Idaho, to "Get to the Snake, make like Esther Williams and float to Boston." In other words, get to the river and swim east.

It was Potts' 25th birthday. Potts was wounded and captured alive, but later died in Quang Binh prison. In January 1992, members of the Joint Task Force for Full Accounting examined war artifacts in the Hanoi military museum and found Potts' ID card. The disposition and location of Walker's remains are unknown.

== Ground rescue ==
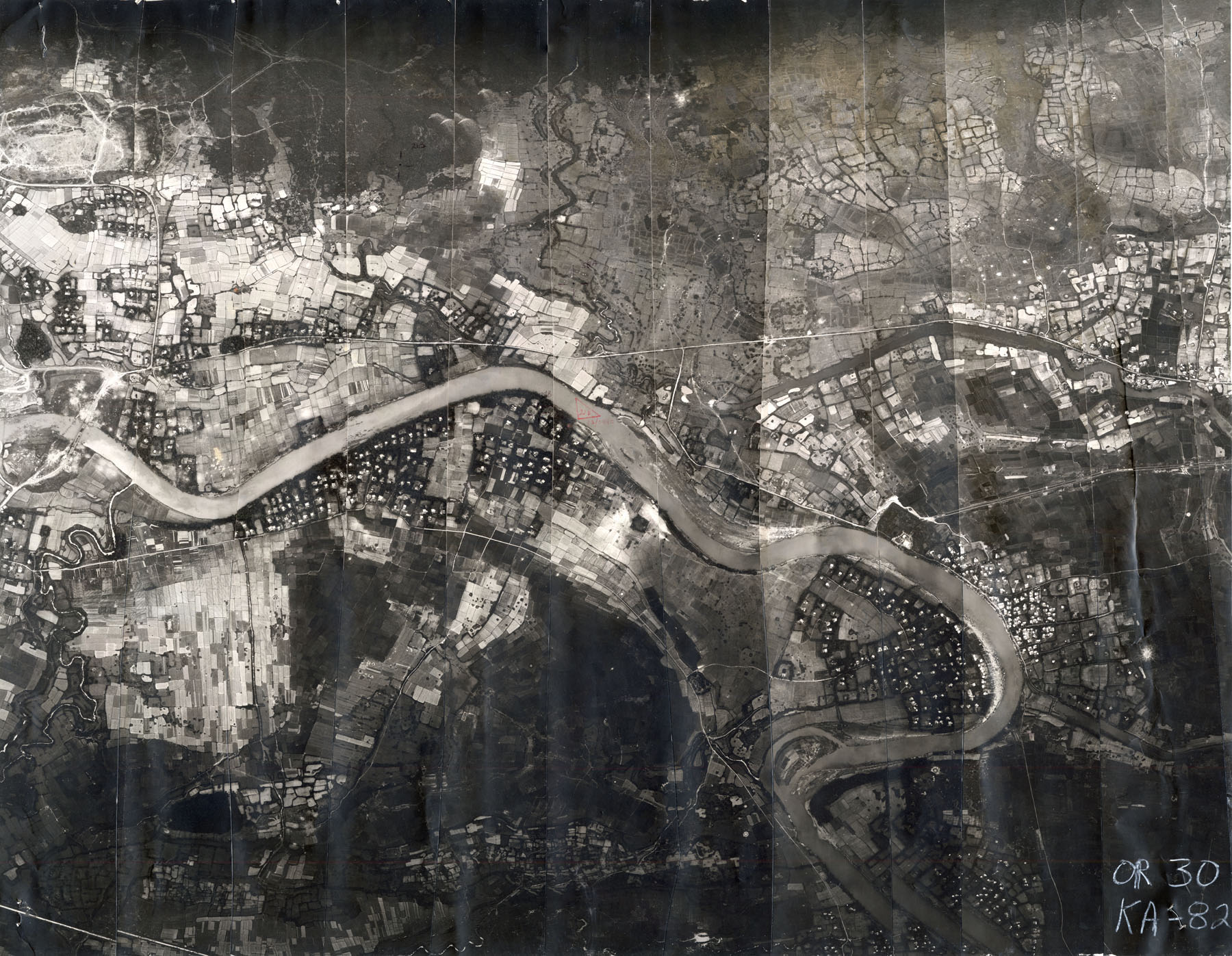
The 3rd Aerospace Rescue Recovery Group used this mosaic reconnaissance photograph to plan Lt. Col. Hambleton and 1st Lt. Mark Clark's rescue. The Cam Lo Bridge is shown at the far left. On 7 April, Hambleton was about 1,000 yards (910 m) above the river and Clark was near the river.

After five days and multiple attempts to rescue Hambleton, five aircraft had been shot down and another 16 seriously damaged, 10 service members had been killed or were missing in action, two were POWs and two were behind front lines also waiting to be rescued. On 8 April, COMUSMACV General Creighton Abrams was briefed on the high losses in the several failed attempts to rescue Hambleton and Clark. He ordered that no further air CSAR would be attempted, but that given Hambleton's Top Secret clearance and knowledge of missiles and counter-measure technology, that every effort should be made to bring him out.

USMC Col. Al Gray suggested a covert, land-based rescue operation. and Lt. Col. Andy Anderson, Commander of the Joint Personnel Recovery Center (JPRC, MACVSOG-80) ordered a ground rescue. In Saigon, Navy SEAL Lt. Thomas R. Norris, one of just three SEAL officers and nine enlisted men remaining in Vietnam, had just completed an assignment in the Mekong Delta. He was waiting for orders when the call came in for a commando operation to get Hambleton out. Norris was immediately dispatched to lead an operation to rescue Hambleton. He recruited five Vietnamese Sea Commando frogmen from the Lien Doan Nguoi Nhai (LDNN), Naval Advisory Detachment (NAD) in Da Nang.

ARVN 3rd Division commander Brigadier General Vũ Văn Giai gave Anderson a Ranger platoon of about 20 men and three M-48 tanks that they used to set up a forward operating base along Highway 9 within observation range of the strategic Cam Lo Bridge. But Giai thought that the mission was insane and refused to take responsibility for the mission once they crossed the Mieu Giang River. Anderson, who spoke Vietnamese, obtained additional intelligence from the headquarters of the 1st Armor Brigade near Dong Ha.

=== Ad hoc code used ===
Hambleton had a much more difficult task—to bypass North Vietnamese-occupied villages and gun emplacements. His rescuers learned that he was one of the best golfers in the Air Force and that he retained a detailed memory of the golf courses he had played. Improvising a code, they used a series of specific golf-course holes to guide him through the mine fields and get him to the Mieu Giang River. They radioed him, "You're going to play 18 holes and you're going to get in the Swanee and make like Esther Williams and Charlie the Tuna. The round starts on No. 1 at Tucson National."

Hambleton initially replied, "What have you been smoking?" But he broke the code. "It took me a half-hour to figure out they were giving me distance and direction," Hambleton explained. "No. 1 at Tucson National is 408 yards running southeast. They wanted me to move southeast 400 yards. The 'course' would lead me to water."

Using the golf-course code, he was directed through the abandoned village that had concealed the guns that shot down his would-be rescuers. Although the village had been bombed, he was confronted by a North Vietnamese soldier. Hambleton killed him using a knife in hand-to-hand combat. At one point, he was given directions to a "refreshment stand" where he would have to "tap his own keg". Physically exhausted, hungry and dehydrated, Hambleton found a banana plantation where he could tap the tree for drinking water. He got lost briefly, and then fell off a cliff, breaking his arm.

The U.S. command in Saigon ordered special high-altitude B-52 bombing raids on nearby targets to divert the Vietnamese from searching for the two men, who were several miles apart.

=== Commandos cross lines ===
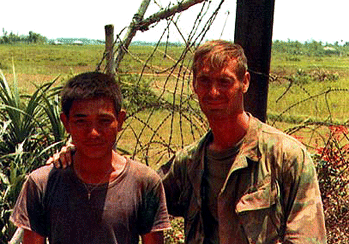
Lt.Thomas R. Norris and Petty Officer Third Class Nguyễn Văn Kiệt went more than 4 kilometres (2.5 mi) behind front lines disguised as fishermen in a sampan to rescue Hambleton. Norris was awarded the Medal of Honor and Nguyễn was recognized with the Navy Cross for their actions.

Anderson now planned to rescue Hambleton and Clark. Norris and Anderson called in air strikes in an attempt to weaken the PAVN resistance, but the PAVN answered with mortar rounds and B-40 rockets that struck the team's position. Anderson, the senior American commander, and Lt. Tho Ngoc Vu, the senior Vietnamese commando, and all of the Vietnamese officers were hurt. The wounded Vietnamese troops had to be evacuated. One commando was killed. Norris was left with five Vietnamese commandos who spoke little English.

Clark was seriously weakened by five days hiding from PAVN forces with little to eat. Since he was closest to the team's position, Norris decided to rescue him first. The rescuer's initial plan was to swim upriver and meet Clark, but Norris tested the current and decided it was too strong. Clark was relayed instructions by the FAC overhead to get in the water after dark and float downstream where Norris and his team would intercept him. The rescue team would have to insert along the riverbank, a much more hazardous route.

Anderson, Norris and five Vietnamese commandos set up an overwatch position near the Mieu Giang River, which ran near the positions of both downed airmen. Anderson ordered Norris to take his team no more than 1 kilometre (0.62 mi) forward and wait for the survivors to come to them, but after departing, Norris ignored the order and turned off his radio. Traveling twice that distance upriver, he passed through frequent North Vietnamese patrols, trucks and columns of tanks.

Clark floated down the cold river and at about 02:00 to 03:00, Norris could hear his heavy breathing on the river. Norris was about to leave cover to pull Clark to shore when a six-man PAVN patrol walked between them. Norris remained hidden, hoping they wouldn't notice Clark's breathing, and knowing that using their weapons would expose the team's position to the hundreds of enemy troops around them. By the time the patrol passed by, Clark had floated on downstream. Norris radioed Clark and instructed him to get out of the river on the south bank.

On his own initiative, Norris left his team and swam downstream several hours looking for Clark. Near dawn, he saw some motion and found Clark hiding behind a sampan on the riverbank. Norris had to persuade Clark to follow him and was finally able to re-link up with the rest of his team. Norris delivered Clark to Anderson at the forward operating base. Clark was transported to the last outpost on the Cua Viet River at Dong Ha by an ARVN M113 armored personnel carrier and then flown to Da Nang.

On 9 April, Hambleton's eighth day of evading PAVN forces all around him, FAC Harold Icke on Bilk 11 kept in constant contact with Hambleton. Icke directed Sandy 01 to drop a Madden survival pack containing food, water, ammunition and extra radios to Hambleton, but it fell 50 metres (160 ft) away, slightly above him, and he was too weak to climb up to it. Icke and the pilots of two A-1 Skyraiders were shocked to see Hambleton come out his hiding place and stand in the open on a sandbar in the river, waving a white flag at them above. Icke knew Hambleton's mental and physical health were precarious. Unknown to him, Hambleton was considerably weakened, having lost 40 pounds (18 kg) in the 10 days since his jet had been shot down.

On 11 April, Hambleton was too weak to move any farther. Norris was well aware of the overwhelming North Vietnamese presence, but decided to proceed upriver again. Hambleton wasn't transmitting on schedule and his occasional radio calls were difficult to understand. Norris could only follow parts of Hambleton's weak transmissions, but knew he would have to go to him. North Vietnamese tanks were spotted at the Cam Lo bridge, and air strikes were carried out to destroy them before the team launched their second rescue mission. The PAVN fixed the location of the outpost and poured mortar and artillery fire on the forward ARVN outpost, killing two of the five remaining ARVN Seals. The wounded were evacuated the next morning.

Norris was left with only three Vietnamese commandos. During their search for Hambleton on the night of 12 April, they headed upriver more than 4 kilometres (2.5 mi), slipping through a massive PAVN force. During the night, upon seeing the extremely large number of North Vietnamese forces, two of the commandos declined to advance further, saying they "refused to follow an American just to rescue an American". Norris convinced them to stay by persuading them that the only way they would get back to safety was to stay with the team. They cautiously searched the river shore for two more hours without success and reluctantly returned to their forward operating base to rest and hope they would be more successful the next night. Icke fixed Hambleton's position during the day so Norris could find him that night.

On the night of 13 April, Norris didn't dare take the two soldiers who had faltered the night before. He was prepared to go alone when Petty Officer Third Class Nguyễn Văn Kiệt volunteered to go with him. Norris bluntly told Nguyễn that he wasn't sure either one of them would return. They worked their way slowly upriver until they came upon an empty, destroyed village. They found clothing and an abandoned sampan. Nguyễn and Norris, who was slightly built, donned Vietnamese clothing and disguised themselves as fishermen.

They rowed quietly up river, but even in the pitch dark and dense fog they could see large numbers of North Vietnamese soldiers and tanks on the shoreline. Stopping to check his map at one point, Norris suddenly realized that two PAVN soldiers were sitting about 10 metres (33 ft) away. However, they were asleep. Traveling upriver in the sampan, they broke out of the heavy fog and found themselves about 4 kilometres (2.5 mi) from their starting point, under the Cam Lo bridge. They had passed Hambleton's position more than 30 minutes ago. Turning around, they worked their way south before putting ashore and began to search for Hambleton.

They found him sitting in a clump of bushes, alive but partly delirious and extremely weakened, having eaten only four small ears of corn in 12 days and having lost 45 pounds (20 kg) since his plane was shot down. He weighed only 128 pounds (58 kg). Sunrise was coming, and although Norris thought it best to wait until dark to return downriver, Hambleton needed to be evacuated immediately. Despite the risk, Norris and Nguyễn hid Hambleton in the bottom of the sampan, covered him with bamboo, and started downriver.

=== Daylight evacuation ===
Their sampan was soon spotted by North Vietnamese troops, some of whom fired at them, but Norris and Nguyễn could not afford to return fire. They paddled furiously, using the current and dense foliage along the far side of the river to their advantage, and trying to out-distance the soldiers. However, when they rounded a bend in the river, the PAVN fired on them with a heavy caliber machine gun. They pulled the sampan to the bank and turned it over to provide some concealment. Icke in Bilk 11 overhead called in air support and five U.S. Navy A-4 Skyhawks from the carrier USS Hancock killed a number of North Vietnamese troops and provided cover for his final escape.

Two A-1 Skyraiders assisted, dropping both explosives and MK47 smoke bombs, providing a smokescreen. Returning to the river, the three men were soon able to receive support from South Vietnamese forces. Landing on the river bank, they were met by some ARVN soldiers. Hambleton was unable to walk and they carried him back to their bunker. There, an M113 armored personnel carrier carried Hambleton, Norris and Nguyen back to Brigade Headquarters in Dong Ha.

News reporters were very aware of the intense rescue efforts to bring Hambleton home. When the rescue team and Hambleton arrived at Dong Ha, a reporter commented to Norris, "It must have been tough out there. I bet you wouldn't do that again." Norris replied, "An American was down in enemy territory. Of course I'd do it again."

From Dong Ha, Hambleton was transported via US Army 571st Dustoff helicopter to the 95th Evacuation Hospital, Da Nang. He was shortly afterward evacuated to the hospital at Clark Air Force Base in the Philippines, where he recuperated for a month.

Norris began to plan for the rescue of Walker, still more than a kilometer behind front lines. Walker managed to evade capture for almost 11 days when on the night of 18 April, without FAC coverage, he moved on his own accord and ran into a local villager who alerted the North Vietnamese. They began tracking him and the next morning the FAC saw PAVN very near Walker's position. Walker radioed the FAC that rescue should not be attempted because PAVN forces were closing in and he was under fire. Bilk 36, an OV-10A reported that Walker was surrounded by more than 20 PAVN soldiers and shortly afterward saw his body lying in the grass. Walker's body was never recovered.

== Rescue cost ==
There were no rules to apply to determine when a search and rescue was no longer cost effective.

=== SAR priority ===
The Air Force remained fully committed to finding and bringing back every downed airman, regardless of the cost. Air crew's morale depended on it. Search and rescue was based on the premise that it was necessary "to secure the safety of pilots as valuable military assets and to enhance their effectiveness by boosting morale." On 2 June 1972, General John Vogt, commander of the 7th Air Force, sent a huge task force of 119 aircraft to rescue Capt. Roger Locher, an F-4 weapons officer who during Operation Linebacker had been shot down only 64 kilometres (40 mi) from Hanoi. When he was picked up by a HH-53 from the 40th Aerospace Rescue and Recovery Squadron, he was within 5 miles (8.0 km) of the heavily defended Yên Bái Air Base and had eluded capture while covering 19 kilometres (12 mi) in North Vietnamese territory for 23 days.

I had to decide whether we should risk the loss of maybe a dozen airplanes and crews just to get one man out. Finally I said to myself, Goddamn it, the one thing that keeps our boys motivated is the certain belief that if they go down, we will do absolutely everything we can to get them out. If that is ever in doubt, morale would tumble. That was my major consideration. So I took it on myself. I didn't ask anybody for permission. I just said, "Go do it!"

There were also political overtones to Hambleton's rescue. "U.S. personnel held as prisoners of war constituted a serious political liability to the U.S. government."

As many as 90 sorties a day were called in to suppress North Vietnamese forces around Hambleton. In contrast, prior to the Easter Offensive, the number of daily sorties was about 10, and during the action, peaked at about 300. During the multi-day effort to rescue the men, the Americans hit the North Vietnamese with over 800 air strikes in direct support of the rescue. Search and rescue took priority over almost all strike targets.

=== No-fire zone enforced ===
To protect the downed airmen and the search and rescue forces, Col. Cecil Muirhead ordered the 7th Air Force to establish a standard 27 kilometres (17 mi) no-fire zone around Hambleton shortly after he went down. It remained in effect until 22:00, and while in force it prohibited friendly artillery, naval gunfire, or aircraft from engaging any target within the designated area without JSARC approval. The no-fire zone encompassed nearly the entire combat zone of the ARVN 3rd Division including the crucial Cam Lo Bridge. As a result, the ARVN in the area was severely hampered in its efforts to stem the PAVN offensive against Dong Ha and Quang Tri City. During this six-hour period, thousands of PAVN troops pushed into the region.

When it was seen that PAVN forces were pouring through the gap unimpeded, the no-fire zone was reduced at 22:00 that night, but not before the action generated considerable debate. One ranking adviser commented, "When viewed in relation to all the events of the day, a worse decision could not have been made." Hambleton commented after the war, "If the taxpayers and my neighbors knew what it cost to pull me out of there, they'd probably shoot me."

Maj. David A. Brookbank, a U.S. Air Force liaison with the ARVN 3rd Division, reported, "The operation cost the 3rd ARVN dearly." He concluded that the restriction gave the North Vietnamese "an opportunity unprecedented in the annals of warfare to advance at will." He stated, "It seems logical to assume that many South Vietnamese troops died because air and artillery support were not available." He warned his superiors that the 3rd Division's officers resented the fact that the 7th Air Force would put thousands of South Vietnamese soldiers' lives at risk to rescue one of their own.

American response to the PAVN operation virtually ground to a halt as air resources were diverted to support the recovery, and for a few days defense of the northern border area was second in priority to rescuing Hambleton.

=== Casualties ===
As a direct result of the rescue operation, five aircraft were lost, 11 people were killed, and two were captured. Additional aircraft were seriously damaged. Hambleton wrote from an Air Force hospital after he was rescued, "I had to stand by and watch six young men die trying to save my life. It was a hell of a price to pay for one life. I'm very sorry." His rescue was, according to Stars and Stripes, "the biggest U.S. air rescue effort of the war."

During the Vietnam War, search and rescue forces saved 3,883 lives at the cost of 71 rescuers and 45 aircraft.

== Aftermath ==
The rescue of Bat 21 was a watershed event for the military and led them to find a new approach to high-threat search and rescue. They recognized that, if a SAR mission was predestined to fail, it should not be attempted, and other options, such as special operations, diversionary tactics and other creative approaches tailored to the situation, had to be considered. Recognizing the need for an aircraft that could deliver better close air support, the Air Force accepted the Navy's A-7 Corsair. The military also improved the night capability of helicopters and area denial munitions.

=== Awards and recognition ===
John Van Etten (Nail 32) received the Distinguished Flying Cross for his part in this rescue. Jimmy D Kempton received the Distinguished Flying Cross for his BLU-52 suppression mission flown on 4 April, Hambleton received the Silver Star, the Distinguished Flying Cross, the Air Medal, the Meritorious Service Medal and a Purple Heart for his actions during this mission. For their heroic actions in rescuing Hambleton behind front lines, Thomas R. Norris was recommended for and received the Medal of Honor, although he initially declined to submit the paperwork.

Norris readily supported the nomination of Petty Officer Third Class Nguyen Van Kiet for the Navy Cross, the highest award that the Navy can give to a foreign national. Nguyen was the only South Vietnamese Naval member awarded the Navy Cross during the Vietnam War, and one of only two South Vietnamese to receive the award.

Navy investigators reviewed the action, interviewed participants, and recommended Norris for the Medal of Honor. He received it from President Gerald Ford in a White House ceremony on 6 March 1976 attended by Michael Thornton, another Navy SEAL who had saved Norris' life on 31 October 1972.

Hundreds of individuals from dozens of units from the Air Force, Army, Navy, Marines and Coast Guard assisted in Hambleton's rescue,and participants in the operation received a total of 234 individual medals.

In 1975, Clark's and Hambleton's rescue was declassified.

=== POW release and recovery of the dead ===
Astorga and Henderson were released in March 1973 during Operation Homecoming. The remains of the rest of the crew of Bat 21, Hambleton's EB-66E Destroyer, Bolte, Gatwood, Giannangeli, Levis and Serex, have not been recovered. The remains of Kulland, Frink and Paschall were recovered and returned to the United States in 1995, where they were buried at Arlington National Cemetery. The bodies of Potts and Walker have not been recovered to date.

The remains of the crew members of HH-53C Jolly Roger 67, Chapman, Call, Avery, Prater, Pearson and Alley, were returned to the United States on 1 October 1997. The six were honored on 19 November 1997 in a full military funeral at Arlington National Cemetery and a headstone commemorating all six airmen was placed at the site. Hambleton was unable to attend due to poor health, but a letter from him was read. He wrote, "They deserve all the accolades that we, the living, can bestow upon them. Again, I thank them, I honor them, and I will always hold great faith in my heart with them." Clark was present. He told the families of the downed fliers that "Each of you played a distinct role and forming the character of these men who so willingly paid a very dear price to help me get out of the jungles of Vietnam. You have my deepest sympathy—you and these six brave men." Advancements in DNA testing allowed the Department of Defense POW/Missing Personnel Office to identify individual remains and release them to their families for burial. Prater's remains were reburied on 19 June 2010. Avery's remains were reburied on 6 April 2012.

=== Later meeting ===
Fifteen years after the rescue, the USAF held a symposium at Nellis Air Force Base and invited all those directly involved. John Van Etten, whose call sign was Nail 32, had never met Hambleton in person. When he stepped on stage and put out his hand to Hambleton, he said, "Hello, Gene, I'm John Van Etten," and Gene replied, "No, you're not. ... you are Nail 32, I would recognize that voice anywhere!"

== In popular culture ==
William C. Anderson wrote an article about the rescue in the August 1981 issue of Reader's Digest followed by the book Bat-21 in 1985. A second book, The Rescue of Bat 21 by Darrel D. Whitcomb was published in 1999 after considerable classified information was released, .

The Lt. Thomas R. Norris building at Naval Special Warfare Group Two in Little Creek, Virginia was named for Norris.

The film Bat*21, starring Gene Hackman as Hambleton, was a dramatized depiction of Hambleton's rescue, based on some of the actual events; Anderson assisted in the screenwriting of the film. Tom Norris' role in the rescue was still secret, and his actions were not depicted in the film.

The rescue was featured in the Vietnam episode of the television series Navy Seals: Untold Stories in 2001. It was featured in "Mysteries at the Museum" in the 2015 episode "Golfer Behind Enemy Lines." The monoculars used by Hambleton are displayed at the Museum of the United States Air Force in a Dayton, Ohio.
