= Iceal Hambleton =

United States Air Force officer

Iceal Eugene Hambleton
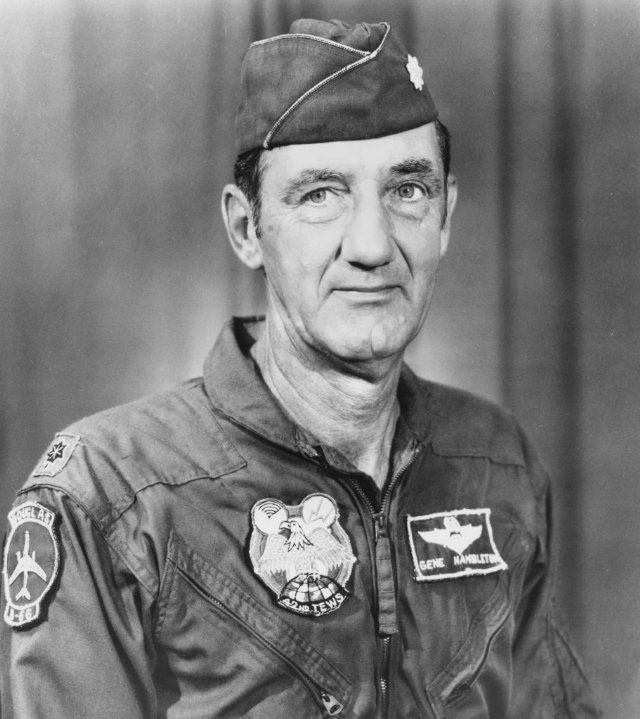
- Hambleton around 1973
- Born: November 16, 1918; Rossville, Illinois, U.S.
- Died: September 19, 2004 (aged 85); Tucson, Arizona, U.S.
- Burial place: Abraham Lincoln National Cemetery, Elwood, Illinois
- Military career
- Allegiance: United States
- Branch: United States Army Air Forces; United States Air Force
- Service years: 1943–1973
- Rank: Lieutenant Colonel
- Nickname: Gene
- Commands: 571st Strategic Missile Squadron
- Conflicts: World War II; Korean War; Vietnam War
- Awards: Silver Star; Distinguished Flying Cross; Air Medal (4); Purple Heart; Meritorious Service Medal

Iceal Eugene "Gene" Hambleton /ˈɪsiəl/ ISS-ee-əl (November 16, 1918 – September 19, 2004) was a career United States Air Force navigator who was shot down over South Vietnam during the 1972 Easter Offensive. He was aboard an EB-66 aircraft whose call sign was Bat 21. As the ranking navigator/EWO on the aircraft, he was seated immediately behind the pilot, giving him the call sign "Bat 21 Bravo". He survived for more than eleven days behind enemy lines until he was retrieved in a ground operation. His rescue was the longest and most costly search and rescue mission during the entire Vietnam War. He received the Silver Star, the Distinguished Flying Cross, the Air Medal, the Meritorious Service Medal and a Purple Heart during his career.

== Military career ==
Hambleton served in the United States Army Air Forces during the last years of World War II without seeing any combat. Released from active duty at the end of the war, he retained a reserve commission and was recalled to active duty by the United States Air Force (USAF) during the 1950s. During the Korean War, he flew 43 sorties as navigator in a B-29 Superfortress.

He then worked during the 1960s on various USAF ballistic missile projects such as the PGM-19 Jupiter, Titan I ICBM and Titan II ICBM. From 1965 to 1971, he commanded the 571st Strategic Missile Squadron at Davis-Monthan Air Force Base in Tucson, Arizona, and was also the deputy chief of operations for his squadron's parent unit, the Strategic Air Command's 390th Strategic Missile Wing at Davis-Monthan AFB.

=== Vietnam War ===
Hambleton switched from the Strategic Air Command to Seventh Air Force and was assigned to the 42nd Tactical Electronic Warfare Squadron (42 TEWS) in Korat, Thailand as a navigator. The 42 TEWS was equipped with EB-66C/E Destroyer aircraft that flew radar and communications jamming missions to disrupt enemy defenses and early warning capabilities.

On his 63rd mission, on April 2, 1972, Hambleton was a navigator aboard an EB-66C gathering signals intelligence, including identifying enemy anti-aircraft radar installations, to enable jamming. The aircraft was helping escort a cell of three B-52 bombers tasked with attacking entrance passes to the Ho Chi Minh trail. While just south of the DMZ and immediately north of Quang Tri at about 30,000 feet (9,100 m), the aircraft was destroyed by a Soviet-built SA-2 Guideline surface-to-air missile.

Hambleton was the only one of the three-man crew able to eject from the crashing aircraft. He parachuted into the middle of the North Vietnamese Easter Offensive and landed in the midst of tens of thousands of North Vietnamese soldiers. His eventual rescue from behind enemy lines was the "largest, longest, and most complex search-and-rescue" operation during the entire Vietnam War.

Hambleton had received water survival training at Homestead Air Force Base, Florida, and escape and evasion training and survival basics at the Pacific Air Command Jungle Survival School in the Philippines. During the rescue operation, five aircraft were shot down, eleven airmen were killed in action, and two were captured. Nine additional aircraft and helicopters were badly damaged during the ongoing rescue attempts.

General Creighton Abrams ordered that no further air rescue operations should be attempted, but ordered a ground rescue operation. Hambleton was a USAF ballistic missile expert with a Top Secret/SCI clearance and his capture by the North Vietnamese Army would have been of tremendous benefit to them and the Soviet Union. Hambleton said after the war that he felt sure if he were captured that he would never have been taken to Hanoi.

Hambleton was rescued after eleven and one half days by Navy SEAL Lieutenant Thomas R. Norris and VNN commando Nguyen Van Kiet in a covert, night-time infiltration 3 kilometres (1.9 mi) behind enemy lines. Norris was awarded the Medal of Honor and Nguyen the Navy Cross. Nguyen was the only South Vietnamese sailor given that award during the war. Norris would go on to become a founding member of the FBI Hostage Rescue Team.

== Death ==
Hambleton died on September 19, 2004, in Tucson, Arizona, at age 85. The cause of death was pneumonia related to lung cancer, according to a family member. He was interred in Abraham Lincoln National Cemetery, Elwood, Illinois.

== Awards and decorations ==
Hambleton was awarded the Silver Star, the Distinguished Flying Cross, the Air Medal, the Meritorious Service Medal and a Purple Heart during his career.

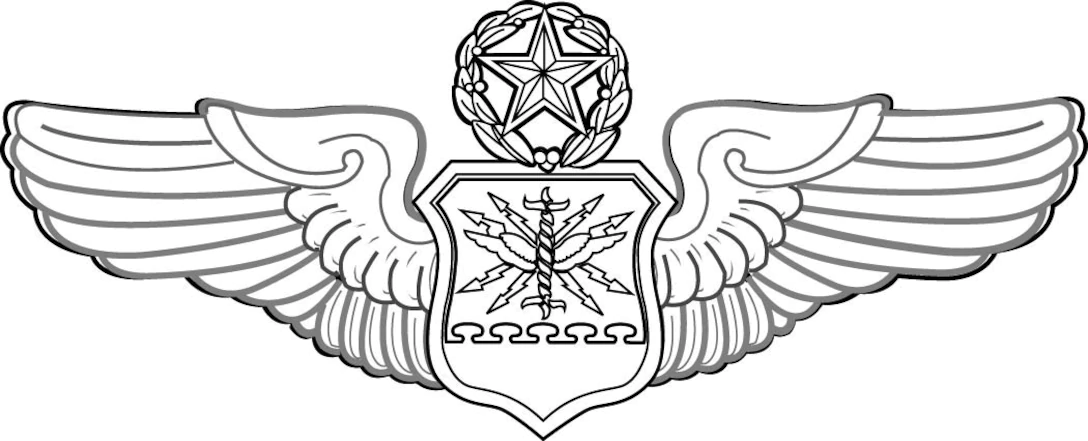

USAF Master Navigator badge
Silver Star		Distinguished Flying Cross
Purple Heart	Meritorious Service Medal	Air Medal with three bronze oak leaf clusters
Air Force Commendation Medal	Air Force Presidential Unit Citation with bronze oak leaf cluster	Air Force Outstanding Unit Award with bronze oak leaf cluster
Combat Readiness Medal	Army Good Conduct Medal	American Campaign Medal
World War II Victory Medal	National Defense Service Medal with service star	Korean Service Medal with two bronze campaign stars
Vietnam Service Medal with three bronze campaign stars	Air Force Longevity Service Award with silver oak leaf cluster	Armed Forces Reserve Medal
Small Arms Expert Marksmanship Ribbon	Republic of Korea Presidential Unit Citation	Republic of Vietnam Gallantry Cross Unit Citation
United Nations Korea Medal	Republic of Vietnam Campaign Medal	Korean War Service Medal

== In popular media ==
The story of Hambleton's evasion and rescue was told in the 1980 book, Bat 21, written by Air Force Colonel William Charles Anderson. This was followed by the dramatic 1988 film, Bat*21, starring Gene Hackman as Hambleton and Danny Glover as a forward air controller. A second book, The Rescue of Bat 21, based on a large amount of declassified information, was written by Col. Darrel D. Whitcomb and published in 1998. Whitcomb was a decorated pilot, and from 1972 to 1974 a forward air controller based in Southeast Asia.

Mysteries of the Unknown - Season 3, Episode 129, Aired on May 13, 2024, did a segment recounting Hambleton's amazing escape and rescue, detailing how the US used coded messages to direct Hambleton to a safe rescue point.
