= Non-U.S. recipients of U.S. gallantry awards =

This is a list of non-U.S. recipients of U.S. gallantry awards.

== Individual awards for valor ==
Other than the awards to unknown soldiers of World War I, the Medal of Honor, the highest United States valor decoration, has not been awarded to a non-U.S. recipient. The highest valor decoration which non-U.S. individuals may receive is the service crosses of the services – the Army Distinguished Service Cross, the Navy Cross, and the Air Force Cross. To date, only one award of the Air Force Cross have been made to a non-U.S. individual, Garry Gordon Cooper. The Army has awarded 440 Distinguished Service Crosses to non-U.S. individuals, with most of these having come in World War I (154) and World War II (258). The Navy and Marine Corps have awarded 124 Navy Crosses to non-U.S. individuals, again with most of these having come in World War I (100) and World War II (19). Among notable recipients of these decorations were:

=== World War I ===
- Ernesto Burzagli of the Royal Italian Navy, awarded Navy Cross in 1919.
- Ronald Niel Stuart of the British Royal Navy, awarded Navy Cross in 1917.

=== World War II ===
- Francis M. (Frank) Bladin, then Air Commodore, later Air Vice Marshal, Royal Australian Air Force. For gallantry in action over Kendari Airdrome, Celebes, Netherlands East Indies, on June 20, 1942. Leading a flight of five bombers on a mission to attack Kendari Airdrome, Air Commodore Bladin successfully brought them over the target, pressed home the attack and returned the flight to the home base. Three enemy fighters were destroyed on the ground and several others seriously damaged, large fires were started in the dispersal areas and many of the buildings were razed. On the return trip the flight was attacked by nine enemy fighters but succeeded in driving them off without loss to themselves.
- Sher Ali, British Indian Army – Sepoy Sher Ali of the 1st Battalion, 2nd Punjab Regiment received the Army Distinguished Service Cross for heroism near San Clemente, Italy on 22 February 1945 during a raiding patrol behind German lines.
- Leslie Charles (Clarence) Allen, MM - nicknamed "Bull" Allen, was an Australian soldier and a recipient of the United States' Silver Star for heroism in the Battle of Mount Tambu, when under fire from the Japanese he rescued twelve United States soldiers who had been wounded in the fighting.
- Jack M. Blamey, Australian Imperial Force – Captain Blamey was posthumously awarded the Army Distinguished Service Cross for heroism in the Buna-Gona campaign on Papua New Guinea in November 1942.
- Sir Thomas Blamey, Australian Army – then-General, later Field Marshal Blamey was decorated with the Army Distinguished Service Cross as Commander, Allied Land Forces, Southwest Pacific for "heroism in action in New Guinea, during the Papuan Campaign, July 23, 1942, to January 8, 1943." He was Jack Blamey's uncle.
- Gordon Bridson DSO, DSC, VRD, Royal New Zealand Naval Volunteer Reserve – then-Lieutenant Commander Bridson received the Navy Cross as commander of HMNZS Kiwi for the sinking of the Japanese submarine I-1 off Guadalcanal.
- Campbell H. Buchanan, Royal New Zealand Navy – Leading Signalman Buchanan was posthumously decorated with the Navy Cross for heroism in HMNZS Kiwi's sinking of the Japanese submarine I-1 off Guadalcanal.
- Vasily Chuikov, Soviet Army – Army Distinguished Service Cross in World War II.
- Harold B. Farncomb CB, DSO, MVO, Royal Australian Navy – received the Navy Cross for gallantry in the invasion of Luzon in the Philippines in January 1945.
- William Henry "Bull" Garing, CBE, DFC, Royal Australian Air Force – Group Captain Garing received the Army Distinguished Service Cross for "extraordinary heroism in action in New Guinea, during the Papuan Campaign, July 23, 1942 to January 8, 1943".
- Jeanette Guyot, French Army – A French resistance operative and OSS Sussex Team member, Jeanette Guyot was one of only two female recipients of the Army Distinguished Service Cross in World War II (the other was also an OSS operative, U.S. civilian Virginia Hall).
- René Joyeuse, Free French Forces – Army (Captain)– An OSS operative and OSS Sussex Team Leader, Operations member, and Co-ordinator, recipient of the Distinguished Service Cross (United States) in World War II.
- Donald G. Kennedy, New Zealand – Captain Kennedy, a Coast Watcher behind Japanese lines in the Solomon Islands, received the Navy Cross for heroism in guerrilla warfare against the Japanese and for rescuing Allied airmen.
- Frederick Thornton Peters VC, DSO, DSC with bar, Royal Navy – Captain Peters, a Canadian officer serving in the Royal Navy, received the Victoria Cross and the Army Distinguished Service Cross for heroism during the November 1942 landings in French North Africa.
- Sir Peter Phipps KBE DSC VRD, Royal New Zealand Navy – then-Lieutenant Commander Phipps received the Navy Cross as commander of HMNZS Moa for the sinking of the Japanese submarine I-1 off Guadalcanal.
- Maurice Edward Swabey, FC/CTH, U.D.F. (South Africa) – then, Major – for gallantry in action near Empoli, Italy, from 13 to 18 October 1944 – Joined the Rhodesian Service and was later transferred to the South African UDF Service (15 May 1940 – 1 January 1941, Southern Rhodesian Rifles (SRRR) Feb 1941 – Feb 1943, First City/Cape Town Highlanders (FC/CTH) March 1943 – August 1945) Africa Star.
- George A. Vasey, Australian Army – Major General Vasey received the Army Distinguished Service Cross for heroism during the Papua New Guinea campaign from July 23, 1942, to January 8, 1943, as commanding general of 7th Division, Australian Army.
- Jesús Villamor, Philippine Army Air Corps – technically counted as a U.S. recipient, as the Philippine armed forces were part of the U.S. armed forces during World War II. Villamor received two Army Distinguished Service Crosses as well as the Philippine Medal of Valor.
- Apollo Miguel Rezk, Brazilian Expeditionary Force – received a Silver Star for leadership in advancing his squad in battle in Italy, and received a Distinguished Service Cross for capturing an advanced post and resisting against artillery for more than 20 hours, even with severe injuries. During his squad's resistance, Lieutenant Rezk counter-attacked the bombarding guns. During the fighting, he also captured 5 prisoners.
- Alberto Martins Torres, (1st Fighter Group, Brazilian Air Force in World War II, part of the 350th Fighter Group of the USAAF), received two Distinguished Flying Cross, one Air Medal, and a Presidential Unit Citation (collective).
- Max Wolff, Brazilian Expeditionary Force – received the Bronze Star.
- Sir George Wootten, Australian Army – Brigadier Wootten was awarded the Army Distinguished Service Cross for heroism during the Papua New Guinea Campaign from 23 July 1942 to 3 January 1943 as commander of the Australian 18th Infantry Brigade.
- Luigi Giorgi, Italian Royal Army – Captain Giorgi fought on the Gothic Line in 1945 and was awarded two Italian Gold Medals and a Silver Star.
- Major David J Lewis, Welch Regiment - Major Lewis received a Silver Star for heroic achievement while serving with the Welch Regiment in Italy on 25 April 1945 for seizing and holding the village of Faccenda against German attacks.

=== Korean War ===
- Jose M. Artiaga, Jr., Philippine Army – First Lieutenant Artiaga, a platoon leader with the Tank Company, 10th Battalion Combat Team, Philippine Expeditionary Force to Korea, was killed in action during the Battle of Yultong Bridge. 1st Lt. Artiaga was posthumously awarded the Philippine Distinguished Conduct Star and the U.S. Army Distinguished Service Cross.
- James Carne, British Army – commanding officer of the 1st Battalion, The Gloucestershire Regiment, in the Battle of the Imjin River in April 1951, Lt. Colonel Carne received the British Victoria Cross and the U.S. Army Distinguished Service Cross.
- Albert Crahay, Belgian Army – commanding officer of the Belgian UN Battalion in Korea, Lt. Colonel Crahay received the Army Distinguished Service Cross for valor in the Battle of the Imjin River in April 1951. Lt. Colonel Crahay was also decorated with the Commander's Cross of the Order of Leopold II and the Belgian Croix de guerre 1940 with palm.
- Louis Misséri, French Army – a sergeant with the French battalion attached to the U.S. 2nd Infantry Division during the Korean War, Misséri received the Army Distinguished Service Cross for heroism during the Battle of Heartbreak Ridge.
- Kenneth Muir VC, British Army – a major with the 1st Battalion, Argyll and Sutherland Highlanders, in the Korean War, Muir posthumously received the British Victoria Cross and the U.S. Army Distinguished Service Cross.
- Conrado D. Yap, Philippine Army – Captain Yap, commander of the Tank Company, 10th Battalion Combat Team, Philippine Expeditionary Force to Korea, was killed in action during the Battle of Yultong Bridge. Capt. Yap was posthumously awarded the Philippine Medal of Valor and the U.S. Army Distinguished Service Cross.

=== Vietnam War ===
- Tran Van Bay, Army of the Republic of Vietnam (ARVN) – Private First Class Tran was posthumously awarded the Navy Cross for heroism after he sacrificed his life to save a U.S. Marine on February 19, 1967.
- Keith Payne VC, Australian Army – received the Victoria Cross, the Silver Star Medal, and the U.S. Army Distinguished Service Cross in the Vietnam War.
- Nguyen Van Kiet, Republic of Vietnam Navy – a petty officer with the Vietnamese naval special forces, Nguyen received the Navy Cross for heroism in April 1972.
- Nguyen Quy An – major in the Republic of Vietnam Air Force and a recipient of the United States Distinguished Flying Cross.
- Ivan J. Cahill – captain in the Australian Army and a recipient of the Bronze Star with combat "V" by the U.S. Secretary of the Navy.
- Garry G. Cooper – Royal Australian Air Force assigned to the US Air Force – received the Air Force Cross, Silver Star Medal, Distinguished Flying Cross with "V", Bronze Star Medal with "V", Purple Heart, Air Medal with "V", and Army Commendation Medal with "V".
- Truong Huu Duc – ARVN brigadier general was posthumously awarded the Silver Star by direction under the president, killed in action April 13, 1972, Binh Long, Vietnam.

== Awards to unknown soldiers ==
=== United Kingdom ===
On November 11, 1920, an unidentified British soldier from a battlefield of the First World War was buried at the western end of the Nave of Westminster Abbey. The Tomb of the Unknown Warrior as it came to be known, was to serve as a memorial to all of the soldiers who had no known grave. On October 17, 1921, the Unknown Warrior was presented with the Medal of Honor, the highest award for gallantry conferred by the United States, by General John J. Pershing, Chief of Staff of the United States Army. The Medal of Honor was awarded by an Act of Congress approved March 4, 1921. The medal hangs in a frame on a pillar close to the tomb.

=== Belgium ===
The Belgian Tomb of the Unknown Soldier (French: Tombeau du Soldat Inconnu, Dutch: Graf van de Onbekende Soldaat) is located in Brussels. In War Department General Orders No. 52 of 1922, the United States announced the award of the Medal of Honor to the Belgian unknown soldier: "By virtue of the authority vested by law in the President of the United States, the Congressional Medal of Honor, emblem of the highest military ideals and virtues, is bestowed in the name of the Congress of the United States upon the unknown, unidentified Belgian soldier in a desire to add all that is possible to the imperishable glory won by the soldiers of Belgium who fought as comrades of the American soldiers during the World War, and to commemorate with them the deeds of the nations associated with the United States of America, by paying this tribute to their unknown dead."

=== France ===
The French Tomb of the Unknown Soldier (French: Tombeau du Soldat Inconnu) is located in the Arc de Triomphe in Paris. The award of the Medal of Honor came in the same Act of Congress of March 4, 1921, which approved the award to the British Unknown Warrior.

=== Italy ===
A joint resolution of Congress on October 12, 1921, awarded the Medal of Honor "upon the unknown, unidentified Italian soldier to be buried in the National Monument to Victor Emanuel II, in Rome."

=== Romania ===
War Department General Orders No. 22 of June 6, 1923, announced the award of the Medal of Honor to the Romanian unknown soldier: "By virtue of the authority vested by law in the President of the United States, the Congressional Medal of Honor, emblem of the highest military ideals and virtues, is bestowed in the name of the Congress of the United States upon the unknown, unidentified Rumanian soldier in a desire to add all that is possible to the imperishable glory won by the soldiers of Rumania who fought as comrades of the American soldiers during the World War, and to commemorate with them the deeds of the nations associated with the United States of America, by paying this tribute to their unknown dead."

== Unit citations ==
=== World War II ===
==== 25 Field Battery, Royal Artillery ====
In October 1944, 7th US Armored Division was holding a very long stretch of the Allied line in The Netherlands when a German force of tanks and infantry attacked and captured the small town of Meijel in the centre of the Division's line; the village of Asten was also threatened. As 7th Armored was operating under British VIII Corps at the time, the corps commander, Gen Sir Richard O'Connor, sent 25th Field Regiment to support the US formation. The German attack intensified and the artillery regiment, especially 25 Field Battery, played a critical role over two and a half days in ensuring that the line was not broken. On the afternoon of 28 October, 25 Battery engaged enemy tanks and infantry continuously for two hours, causing many casualties in the attackers' ranks. Although the Germans advanced some 700–1,000 yards, their advance was held. Further reinforcements, from 15th (Scottish) Division, arrived on the 29th and 7th Armored was able to withdraw, having suffered heavily but not having allowed the enemy to pass. For its part in the battle, 25 Battery was awarded a Distinguished Unit Citation and an Honour Title, becoming 25 (Asten) Battery, Royal Artillery. In 1947 it was renumbered as 59 (Asten) Battery and is today 59 (Asten) Training Battery.

==== No. 2 and 13 Squadron, Royal Australian Air Force ====
Nos. 2 and 13 Squadrons, Royal Australian Air Force were awarded the Distinguished Unit Citation for their service in the Timor area in mid-1942. Despite being awarded to No. 13 Squadron in October 1942 the citation it was not officially presented to the unit until May 1990. The Distinguished Unit Citation was redesignated after World War II as the Presidential Unit Citation.

==== French 2nd Armored Division ====
The French 2nd Armored Division (2e Division Blindée) was awarded the Distinguished Unit Citation for the liberation of Saverne and Strasbourg during the period from 16 to 24 November 1944.

==== Marching Regiment of the Foreign Legion ====
Distinguished Unit Citation with the inscription "Rhine–Bavarian Alps" for Marching Regiment of the Foreign Legion (French: Régiment de Marche de la Légion Etrangère, R.M.L.E); redesignated as 3rd Foreign Infantry Regiment (French: 3e Régiment étranger d'infanterie,3^{ème}REI) on July 1, 1945; for the R.M.L.E actions in the drive of the Sixth United States Army Group, of which the French First Army was part, across the Rhine River into southern Germany to Bavaria and Austria in 1945.

==== 1st Brazilian Fighter Group ====
On April 22, 1945, the 1st Brazilian Fighter Group was awarded the Distinguished Unit Citation for its actions in the Po Valley region of Italy in World War II. The Brazilians, operating in Italy in support of Allied forces, destroyed in one day (April 22, 1945) over 45 vehicles, strafed pontoon bridges on the River Po (hampering a German retreat) and harassed fixed positions of the German forces. From the citation:

"The casualties that they suffered reduced their pilot strength to about one half that of the United States Army Air Force squadrons operating in the same area, but they flew an equal number of sorties as their US counterparts ... Eleven missions of 44 sorties were flown destroying nine motor transports and damaging 17. Additionally, they destroyed the facilities of a motor pool, immobilized 35 horse vehicles, damaged a road bridge and a pontoon bridge, destroyed 14 and damaged three enemy-occupied buildings, and attacked four military positions and inflicted much other damage."

=== Korean War ===
==== Royal Marines at the Battle of Chosin Reservoir ====
Royal Marines

Task Force Drysdale, a combined unit of the United States 1st Marine Division which included 41 Commando, Royal Marines, formed in November 1950 at Hungnam in South Korea, with the aim of fighting its way to reinforce the garrison at Hagaru on the southern tip of the Chosin Reservoir. The column of Drysdale came under sustained attack almost from the off, but was eventually able to force its way through to Hagaru, with 321 casualties sustained. On entering the town, 41 Commando was nominated as the garrison reserve, and was called into action on the night of November 29/November 30, when part of the Commando was called on to reinforce a unit of the United States Marine Corps that was part of Drysdale on a hill overlooking the Chinese lines. During this night, the two Chinese divisions facing them sustained over 5000 casualties. Despite this, other United Nations forces along the reservoir were failing to hold the lines. So, the force at Hagaru were ordered to withdraw back to Hungnam. 41 Commando, along with the 5th Marine Battalion, brought up the rear, beginning on December 6. The force stopped at Koto-Ri on December 8, where a mass grave for 117 dead troops was prepared. 41 Commando moved out in the afternoon to guard the high ground over the formation against infiltration during the night. On December 9, the formation moved out to march the remaining distance to the Hungnam bridgehead, getting clear by December 11 and embarking with 22,000 US Marines to be shipped down to Pusan. The action had left 41 Commando with 93 casualties, and so the unit was withdrawn to Japan for reinforcement during the winter of 1950/51.

The actions of 1st Marine Division led to it receiving a Presidential Unit Citation, a US Navy award. Although 41 Commando was not mentioned in the original citation (as US Navy regulations did not originally allow bestowal upon foreign forces), representations to the USMC subsequently led to it also receiving the award, which was accepted in 1957. The streamer was born on the Regimental Colour of 41 Commando, Royal Marines until its disbandment in 1981.

==== UN Forces in the Chinese spring offensive ====
During the April 1951 Chinese spring offensive, along the breadth of the United Nations front, UN forces faced attacks from numerically superior Chinese Communist forces. Among the units which received the Distinguished Unit Citation for battles during this offensive were the following:

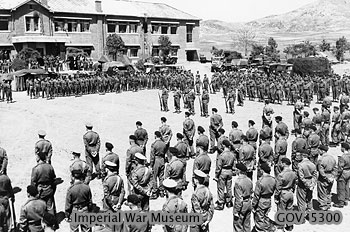
Representatives of United Kingdom, Canadian, Australian and Belgian units of the British 29th Brigade stand at Parade Rest, during ceremonies in which the American Presidential Unit Citation was awarded to the Gloucestershire Regiment and the 170th Independent Mortar Battalion, Royal Artillery, 8 May 1951.

- 1st Battalion, Gloucestershire Regiment, together with C Troop, 170 Mortar Battery, Royal Artillery: In the Battle of the Imjin River, 1st Battalion, Gloucestershire Regiment, together with C Troop, 170 Mortar Battery, Royal Artillery, was surrounded and all but a handful of its soldiers killed or captured after holding off the Chinese for three days. The streamer of the citation, bearing the honour 'Solma-ri', was attached to the Regimental Colour of the 1st Battalion. Since the amalgamation of the Gloucestershire Regiment, this tradition has been assumed by the 1st Battalion, Royal Gloucestershire, Berkshire and Wiltshire Light Infantry until its amalgamation into The Rifles in 2007. In addition to the Presidential Unit Citation, 170 Mortar Battery was awarded an Honour Title to become 170 (Imjin) Battery, Royal Artillery. Today it is 25/170 (Imjin) Battery, of the 47th Regiment Royal Artillery.
- Belgian–Luxembourg UN Battalion: a Belgian battalion with an attached Luxembourg platoon, attached to the British 29th Brigade, the battalion initially held the brigade's right flank and was able to withdraw under enemy fire and move into the gap created by the Chinese surrounding of the Glosters. The Belgians and Luxembourgers participated in the attempts to relieve the Glosters and to hold the line.
- Tank Company, 10th Battalion Combat Team, Philippine Expeditionary Force to Korea: Subjected to fierce Chinese attacks on the night of April 22–23, elements of the Philippine battalion were overrun during the Battle of Yultong Bridge. Troops of the Tank Company attacked to successfully recapture lost positions and recover fallen comrades. After Yultong Bridge, the Philippine battalion participated in the attempts to relieve the Glosters.
- 3rd Battalion, Royal Australian Regiment (3RAR) and 2nd Battalion, Princess Patricia's Canadian Light Infantry (2PPCLI a.k.a. "The Patricias"): 3RAR and 2PPCLI were in the vanguard of the 1st Commonwealth Division's 27th Brigade, defending the Kapyong valley, in the Battle of Kapyong during the Chinese Spring Offensive. In recognition of their heroic actions at Kapyong, both 3RAR and 2PPCLI, together with A Company of the U.S. Army's 72nd Heavy Tank Battalion, were awarded the Distinguished Unit Citation. The streamer of the citation, bearing the honour 'Kapyong', is carried on the Regimental Colours of the Australian and Canadian battalions. In addition, although not a U.S. gallantry award, the 16th Field Regiment of the Royal New Zealand Artillery were awarded the Republic of Korea Presidential Unit Citation for their actions during the Battle of Kapyong.

==== French Bataillon de Corée ====
The French Battalion (Bataillon de Corée) was a volunteer battalion which arrived in Korea at the end of November 1950 and was attached to the 23rd Infantry Regiment of the U.S. 2nd Infantry Division. The battalion fought in numerous battles, including the Battle of the Twin Tunnels, Chipyong-ni, Hongchon, Hwachon Reservoir, the Battle of Heartbreak Ridge, and the Battle of Arrowhead Hill, until departing Korea in July 1953. The French Battalion earned three Unit Citations (for Twin Tunnels, Chipyong-ni, and Hwachon Reservoir) and a Republic of Korea Presidential Unit Citation for Battle of Arrowhead Hill. It is unclear from the sources, but the "Hwachon Reservoir" citation may have been a Presidential Unit Citation, a US Navy award, while the first two were the army version of the time, the Distinguished Unit Citation.

==== Netherlands Detachment United Nations ====
The Dutch Battalion (Netherlands Detachment United Nations or Van Heutsz battalion) was a volunteer battalion that was part of the Regiment Van Heutsz which arrived in Korea at the end of November 1950. It was attached to the 38th Infantry Regiment (Rock of the Marne), which was part of the 2nd Infantry (Indianhead) Division. The battalion fought in numerous battles, including Battle of Wonju, Soyang River Battle, Battle of Heartbreak Ridge, and in the Iron Triangle. It left Korea in November 1954, leaving 123 dead and 463 wounded. The Dutch battalion was awarded two Distinguished Unit Citations (with the citations 'Hongchon, Korea' and 'Hoengsong, Wonju, Korea') and two Republic of Korea Presidential Unit Citations for the entire campaign. The decorations were attached to the battalion flag. The battle honour 'Korea 1950–1954' was awarded to the Regiment Van Heutsz. The traditions of the Netherlands Detachment United Nations are still maintained by the Regiment Van Heutsz, the most decorated regiment in the Royal Netherlands Army.

==== Turkish Brigade ====
President Harry Truman signed a Distinguished Unit Citation on July 11, 1951, for the Turkish Brigade's acts of heroism. It reads: "The Turkish Brigade, a member of the United Nations Forces in Korea is cited for exceptionally outstanding performance of duty in combat in the area of Kumyangjang-ni, Korea, from 25 to 27 January 1951."

==== Greek Expeditionary Force ====
The Greek Expeditionary Force received a total of two Distinguished Unit Citations and one Navy Presidential Unit Citation. The two army awards went to the Force's infantry battalion (known as the Sparta Battalion) for the capture of Scotch Hill (October 1951) and the defense of Outpost Harry (17–18 June 1953), while Flight 13 of the Hellenic Air Force was awarded a Presidential Unit Citation for its heroic evacuation of US Marines from Hagaru-ri (December 1950).

The rifle company involved in the defense of Outpost Harry received the following Distinguished Unit Citation:

"DEPARTMENT OF THE ARMY Washington D. C., 10 March 1955 GENERAL ORDERS 18

DISTINGUISHED UNIT CITATION Company P Greek Expeditionary Forces Battalion (Second Award) is cited for extraordinary heroism and outstanding performance of duty in action against an armed enemy in the vicinity of Surang-Ni, Korea during the period 17 June to 18 June 1953. Assigned the defense of a vital outpost position (Harry), the company encountered a major enemy assault on the evening of June 17. After an intense concentration of enemy mortar and artillery fire, the hostile forces, which had taken up an attack position on the northeast and northwest side of the outpost, moved rapidly through their own and friendly artillery fire to gain a foothold on the northern slope of the position. Refusing to withdraw, Company P closed in and met the attackers in a furious hand-to-hand struggle in which many of the enemy were driven off. The aggressors regrouped, quickly attacked a second time, and again gained the friendly trenches. Immediately, the Greek Forces launched a series of counterattacks, simultaneously dispatching a diversionary force to the east of the outpost which successfully channeled the enemy thrusts. After 2 hours of close in fighting, the aggressors were again routed and the friendly positions restored. The outstanding conduct and exemplary courage exhibited by members of Company P, Greek Expeditionary Forces Battalion, reflects great credit on themselves and are in keeping with the finest traditions of the military service and the Kingdom of Greece."

The Greeks were awarded 6 U.S. Distinguished Service Crosses, 32 Silver Stars, and 110 Bronze Stars. Furthermore, 19 members of 13th Flight received the Air Medal for the Hagaru-ri evacuation operation in December 1950.

=== Vietnam War ===
==== 1st Division, Army of the Republic of Vietnam ====
The 1st Division (South Vietnam) were awarded a Presidential Unit Citation. The HQ company under Ngô Quang Trưởng with 200 staff and officers with an attached reconnaissance company, of 50 men under the Hac Bao (Black Panthers) commanded by Tran Ngoc "Harry" Hue held out for an entire month in Hue Citadel while completely surrounded during the Battle of Huế. The city was quickly and completely surrounded by several elite battalions of PAVN units on every side but repulsed all attempts at storming the citadel. The defence of Hue Citadel despite overwhelming odds was regarded as the most pivotal moment of the battle, and had significant symbolic value for many in South Vietnam during the Tet Offensive. The commander of the Hac Bao, Tran Ngoc Hue would also be awarded a Silver Star personally by General Creighton Abrams.

==== Republic of Vietnam Marine Division ====
The Republic of Vietnam Marine Division was awarded a Presidential Unit Citation in 1972 for the Second Battle of Quảng Trị, recapturing the city after it was over-run by 45,000 PAVN whom are deploying for the first time armoured and mechanised divisions. This division was still recovering from Lam Son 719, which saw 1/4th of this entire division killed or wounded. During the battle this unit alone had lost almost 3,658 KIA while inflicting 17,819 enemy casualties, capturing 5,000 weapons and vehicles and disabling dozens of T-54/T-55 tanks. The battle was fought, alongside the Airborne Division arrayed against the three most elite and longest serving divisions of the PAVN, the "Iron and Steel" divisions of the 308th Division, 304th Division and 325th Division. This was the single bloodiest, longest and most intense engagement in the entire war and the most defining urban battle, far surpassing the Battle of Huế in all respects.

1st Armored Brigade, Army of the Republic of Vietnam

A Presidential Unit Citation is awarded by Richard Nixon in 1970 for Operation Duong Son. It was conducted in the Quế Sơn District in 1970 by the newly created 1st Armored Brigade Headquarters, composed of an Armored Cavalry Squadron, a Regional Force Battalion and 2 Regular Battalions. The 1st Armored Brigade conducted its first mobile independent operations along the sea in the northern part of Military Region 1. Controlling up to two armored cavalry regiments, Rangers, and territorial forces, the brigade roamed over the area for two months and succeeded in destroying three enemy battalions. Almost 900 Viet Cong and PAVN were killed or captured, while the brigade lost sixty-eight men.

==== 37th Ranger Battalion, Army of the Republic of Vietnam ====
This unit earned the single most Presidential Unit Citation of any unit in the war, and was the most decorated of the Ranger Battalion, out of the 11 Battalions in the ARVN Rangers whom had received presidential unit citations. South Vietnamese Army's 37th Ranger Battalion received no less than three United States Army Presidential Unit Citations. The first was awarded in Department of the Army General Order 20 of 1967, for extraordinary heroism in the vicinity of Thach Tru, Quang Ngai Province on November 22, 1965. This was during a battle in which a much larger regiment of the crack 18th NVA Regiment and VC 45th Heavy Weapons Unit had staged a multi-pronged attack and were repulsed. Reinforcing the unit in the battle was a reinforcement of 3rd Battalion, 7th Regiment Marines. The second was awarded in Department of the Army General Order 23 of 1969, for extraordinary heroism in the period of January 27 to February 25, 1968. The third was awarded in Department of the Army General Order 37 of 1973, for extraordinary heroism in the period of February 11 to April 24, 1970.

==== 42nd Ranger Battalion, Army of the Republic of Vietnam ====
A twice-decorated battalion that received Presidential Unit Citation from two different presidents. First decorated in October 1965 with a direct public speech by President Johnson. The Operation involved was a search-and-destroy in which they were on the defensive and attacked by a much larger enemy force. The 42nd Ranger Battalion was commended for over-turning the attacking forces and turning them onto the defensive where they proceeded to rout them.

Afterwards decorated on March 7, 1968, for assaulting a well-defended enemy stronghold. This unit was well-regarded as an assault unit capable of over-running well concealed fortifications and positions. Among the 11 ARVN Ranger Units awarded with the Presidential Unit Citation, the 42nd was among the most highly decorated.

==== 39th Ranger Battalion, Army of the Republic of Vietnam ====
Twice-decorated with a Presidential Unit Citation, awarded for actions between February 18 and 28, 1968, during the Tet Offensive and again for actions between February 11 to April 24, 1970. Alongside the 42nd and 37th these were the most decorated Ranger battalions of the war. One of the chosen forward assault groups during Operation Lam Son 719, after securing an outpost, when expected reinforcements were halted this unit was in turn entirely encircled by armoured and infantry units from the elite 102nd Regiment, 308th Infantry Division (Vietnam). Fighting its way out of a cordon, the unit was annihilated with 178 KIA/MIA and 148 WIA out of an initial 430, although inflicting 639 KIA upon the 102nd Regiment.

==== 52nd Ranger Battalion, Army of the Republic of Vietnam ====
On 11 November 1965, the 52nd Ranger Battalion was augmented to the US 11th Armored Cavalry Regiment and conducted an air assault to relief a US element of the 11th ACR that had been ambushed by the VC 275th Regiment near Kim Hai hamlet, in the village of Phuoc Hoa on Route 15, in Phuoc Tuy Province and received a United States Presidential Unit Citation.

==== 44th Ranger Battalion, Army of the Republic of Vietnam ====
On April 6, 1965, the 44th Ranger Battalion was a reserve element of a larger force engaged in a search and destroy operation against two Viet Cong force battalions. The battalion was lifted by helicopter into battle when the lead infantry battalion accompanied by an armored personnel carrier troop were halted by intense fire delivered on their positions by the well-entrenched and camouflaged enemy. Upon entering into the landing zone, the enemy delivered withering machine gun fire. Despite the loss of their executive officer, a U.S. Army Advisor, and three helicopters during the lift the unit pursued and over-turned the attacking ambush forces, forcing them to withdraw and thereby saving the ambushed and pinned forces. For these actions the unit has earned a Presidential Unit Citation.

==== Second Battalion, Vietnamese Marine Brigade, Army of the Republic of Vietnam ====
The Second Battalion of the Republic of Vietnam Marine Division, nicknamed Crazy Buffaloes was the most decorated Republic of Vietnam Marine Division. A Presidential Unit Citation was earned at the battle of Phung Du in November 1966. This was alongside a previously earned Division-level commendation for participation in the Second Battle of Quảng Trị.

==== D Company, 6th Battalion Royal Australian Regiment – Battle of Long Tan ====
A mortar and recoilless rifle attack on the Task Force area opened Operation Vendetta, on the night of August 16/17, 1966. B Company, of the 6th Battalion, Royal Australian Regiment was initially dispatched to clear the area to the east of the Task Force base. D Company took over from B Company on August 18, 1966. D Company made contact with the enemy force of regimental size and was soon under attack from three sides. The battle was fought into the night under a blanket of mist and heavy monsoonal rain, but D Company held its ground with heroism and grim determination. The remainder of the battalion deployed to aid the beleaguered Company. With the help of armoured personnel carriers of 3 Troop, 1 APC Squadron hit the flank of a battalion size force which was forming up to assault the rear of D Company, inflicted many casualties and forced the enemy from the battlefield. A Presidential Unit Citation was awarded to D Company by the then President of the United States, Lyndon B. Johnson, for the Battle of Long Tan. August 18 is now commemorated each year as Long Tan Day, in memory of Australian soldiers who served in the Vietnam War.

The streamer of the citation, bearing the honour 'Long Tan', is carried on the Regimental Colour of the 6th Battalion, Royal Australian Regiment.

==== 514th Tactical Fighter Squadron, Republic of Vietnam Air Force ====
"The 514th Tactical Fighter Squadron, a unit of the South Vietnam Air Force, is cited for extraordinary heroism and outstanding performance of duty in combat against an armed enemy of the Republic of Vietnam throughout the period 1 January 1964 to 28 February 1965. Participating in daily actions in support of Republic of Vietnam ground operations, the courageous men of the 514th Tactical Fighter Squadron carried out their attacks on military targets with indomitable spirit and determination. The fierce determination to destroy the enemy displayed by the men of this unit was exemplified in the 6,000 sorties, and 13,000 flying hours compiled in support of ground operations during this period."

==== 2nd Battalion, 31st Regiment 21st Infantry Division, Army of the Republic of Vietnam ====
This unit earned a Presidential Unit Citation. Part of a heliborne rapid-reaction force, the 2nd Battalion, 31st Regiment of the 21st Division was ordered to rescue a flanked battalion trapped in muddy swamps and flanked by Main Force Viet Cong units. With neither artillery, air-strike or armed helicopter support the unit moved through 600 m of rice paddy to assault six machine-gun nests. The unit was able to close-in and route forces pinning down the two battalions through hand-to-hand combat.

==== 41st Regimental Headquarters, Army of the Republic of Vietnam ====
A Presidential Unit Citation for the 41st Regimental Headquarters, including the 1st Battalion and 3rd, 41st Regiment, and 3rd Troop, 8th Reconnaissance Squadron for action against one of the more elite units of the NVA, the crack 18th Regiment/312th Division. The attack on regimental quarters was halted, and the commemoration was described with Lyndon Johnson describing the engagement as "in defeating the 7th and 8th Battalions of the 18th North Vietnam Army Regiment, a force equal to its own, ranks as one of the outstanding accomplishments in the Vietnamese conflict and is in the highest traditions of the Free World Forces."

==== HQ Company of the 3rd Platoon, 5th and the 6th Company of the 2nd Battalion, 9th Regiment, 5th Infantry Division, ARVN ====
The HQ Company HQ had earned a Presidential Unit Citation from Lyndon Johnson. The statement reads:

"The foregoing units distinguished themselves by extraordinary heroism during the defense of a Revolutionary Development Program pacification project near Tan Hung, Binh Long Province, Republic of Vietnam, on 11 July 1967 when they repulsed a full scale attack on their position by the 141st North Vietnamese Army Regiment. This numerically superior enemy force was equipped with numerous automatic weapons, large supplies of ammunition, and new equipment. During the early morning hours, the Republic of Vietnam units were subjected to a heavy volume of mortar fire followed by three separate human wave assaults against the position. In each case, the enemy penetrations of the perimeter were beaten back by fierce counterattacks. The viciousness of the close combat and the effectiveness of the defenders were fully demonstrated when more than 70 enemy bodies were found within the inner fortifications after the battle. Supported by air and artillery, the valiant defenders held their position, accounted for more than 170 North Vietnamese soldiers, and captured over 90 individual and crew served weapons. The determination, devotion to duty, and indomitable courage demonstrated by these men of the 2d Battalion, 9th Regiment, are in keeping with the highest traditions of military service and reflect great credit upon themselves, their unit, and the Republic of Vietnam."

==== 74th Tactical Wing, Vietnamese Air Force ====
The 74th Tactical Wing of the Vietnamese Air Force operating from July 1966 to February 1968 flew over 52,000 sorties with the 520th Fighter Squadron (A-1H), 74th Tactical Wing, flew 17,730 sorties in combat against armed hostile forces. This unit earned a Presidential Unit Citation.

"The officers and airmen of the wing repeatedly performed outstanding acts of heroism and gallantry, both individually and collectively, and demonstrated an esprit de corps in keeping with the highest traditions of the free military Air Forces. The 74th Tactical Wing inflicted severe damage on the hostile forces and, at the same time, saved countless Vietnamese and American lives. Despite their own tragic casualties and heavy battle damage, the men of the wing consistently maintained outstanding morale."

==== 9th Company, 1st Cavalry Regiment, Republic of Korea Army ====
The 9th Company, 1st Cavalry Regiment, Republic of Korea Army was awarded the Presidential Unit Citation on August 9, 1968, for its valor on August 9–10, 1966 in the defense of Landing Zone 27 Victor, Pleiku Province, Republic of Vietnam. The citation reads, in part:

"About one hour before midnight the sounds of digging were heard outside the perimeter. The suspicious area was illuminated by a searchlight and reconnoitered by machine-gun fire from one of the United States Army tanks under operational control of the 9th Company. This action triggered the first of a series of violent attacks made against the perimeter by a North Vietnamese Army battalion and reinforced by heavy fire from recoilless rifles, mortars, and rockets. During the next six hours, the foe made repeated assaults from differing directions, only to be beaten back by the coordinated fire from the stalwart defenders. A single enemy managed to penetrate into the position, but this danger was quickly eliminated by a Korean soldier wielding a bayonet. Throughout this long battle the 9th Company held its position and exhibited great gallantry under intense fire and repeated ground attacks. The tenacious defense and subsequent mop-up of the battlefield virtually eliminated the enemy battalion as an effective fighting unit. The heavy losses inflicted upon the numerically superior enemy force attest to the physical courage, determination, and skill of the defenders. ..."

==== 1st Company, Royal Thailand Army Volunteer Regiment and attached units ====
The 1st Company, Royal Thailand Army Volunteer Regiment and several attached and supporting units – a medical platoon, an armored personnel carrier platoon and an artillery battery – were awarded the Presidential Unit Citation by President Richard Nixon on November 5, 1969, for extraordinary heroism on December 20–21, 1967 in Vietnam. According to the citation:

"During this period the 1st Company was given the mission of conducting combat operations and revolutionary development support in Bien Hoa Province. Elements of the Viet Cong 274th Main Force Battalion and the 3d Main Force Battalion attacked the 1st Company on the night of 20 December. This attack was repulsed by the heroic Thai in a battle characterized by savage hand-to-hand combat with devastating effect on the enemy. By the unparalleled application of exceptional imagination, fearless courage, and unrelenting determination, the 1st Company succeeded in repelling three assaults by the superior enemy force. Although harassed by constant mortar fire, the valiant defenders aggressively engaged the enemy and inflicted heavy enemy casualties. Individual acts of heroism were numerous, and during the entire battle the company officers, through their superb leadership, provided an inspirational example to the rest of the company. The Thai victory deprived the enemy of one of its long-established infiltration and resupply routes. The aggressiveness, determination, enthusiasm, and exemplary courage displayed by the members of the 1st Company and its attached and supporting units reflect great credit upon themselves, the Royal Thailand Army, and the Allied cause in the Republic of Vietnam."

==== 3rd Airborne Task Force, Army of the Republic of Vietnam ====
The 3rd Airborne Task Force, Army of the Republic of Vietnam, consisting of the Task Force Headquarters and 2nd and 3rd Vietnamese Airborne Battalions, was awarded the Presidential Unit Citation for heroism in Operation Kham Jei 180 from November 15–22, 1967.

==== 7th Airborne Battalion, Army of the Republic of Vietnam ====
The 7th Airborne Battalion, Republic of Vietnam Airborne Division was awarded a Presidential Unit Citation for repelling attacks by overwhelming NVA Units in Quang Ngai province on February 19, 1967 . A lack of air support due to weather conditions saw hand-to-hand fighting, in which a larger force attacked from three sides and was repulsed.

==== 8th Airborne Battalion, Army of the Republic of Vietnam ====
The 8th Airborne Battalion, Republic of Vietnam Airborne Division was awarded a Presidential Unit Citation for combat action on February 25–28, 1967 for moving through 800 m of open-rice fields to assault a fortified position. Two days later the same unit was ordered to move through 2000 meters in order to flank another enemy position. Despite heavy casualties, the unit fought the next day and assaulted a machine-gun and mortar position, deploying small-arms, bayonets and hand-grenades to overwhelm enemy positions. This is with the unit having relatively little artillery support throughout the battle, and with other units in disarray.

==== 1st Battalion Group, Royal Australian Regiment, Vietnam, 1965–1966 ====
Between May 1965 and May 1966, the 1st Battalion Group, Royal Australian Regiment, consisting of the 1st Battalion, Royal Australian Regiment, the 4th/19th Prince of Wales's Light Horse, 105 Field Battery Royal Australian Artillery, 3 Field Troop Royal Australian Engineers, 161st Independent Reconnaissance Flight, and 1st Australian Logistical Support Company served as part of the US 173rd Airborne Brigade in Vietnam. During that time, the Brigade was constantly involved in heavy fighting, as it was invariably one of the leading units in the front line. For its service throughout this period, the 1st Battalion, Royal Australian Regiment, and its attachments were awarded the United States Meritorious Unit Commendation.

The streamer of the commendation, bearing the honour 'Vietnam 1965–66', is carried on the Regimental Colour of the 1st Battalion, Royal Australian Regiment.

==== 3rd Armored Cavalry Squadron, Army of the Republic of Vietnam ====
In 1971, the Presidential Unit Citation (US) was awarded to the 3d Armored Cavalry Squadron and attached U.S. Advisor/Liaison Personnel (MACV) for extraordinary heroism in action against an armed enemy during the period January 1, 1968, to September 30, 1968, in Pleiku and Binh Dinh Provinces. The Squadron engaged a Viet Cong battalion near the city of Pleiku during the Tet Offensive. Elements of the Squadron spearheaded direct strikes against the 18th North Vietnamese Army regiment in other major engagements in Binh Dinh Province and the city of Phu My.
On February 1, 1968, they fought a pitched battle with the Liberation Front's H-15 Local Force Battalion in or near Pleiku.

In August 1968, elements of the 3rd ARVN Cavalry, along with a reaction platoon from the 2/1st Cav, OPCONed to the 4th Inf, foiled an attempted NVA ambush, killing 31 enemy. The following day the soldiers found 10 more bodies bringing the toll to 41 enemy killed. – In the third day of enemy harassment of convoys along Highway 14 in Kontum Province, an estimated force of two NVA companies attacked a 4th Div convoy 14 miles south of Kontum with mortar, recoilless rifle, small arms, and rocket and machinegun fire. Armored cars from the 4th MP Company immediately returned the fire. At the outbreak of the attack, tanks and armored cavalry assault vehicles of the 3rd ARVN Cavalry and the 2/1st Cav, which had been deployed along the highway in anticipation of possible contact, began to pour heavy fire into the enemy positions. Under the onslaught of allied armor the enemy broke contact, leaving 41 killed behind.

==== 883D Company, Regional Force, Army of the Republic of Vietnam ====
On 9 March the 883D Company of the South Vietnamese Regional Force earned a Presidential Unit Citation, militia assigned the defense of the village of Ha Tay, with a strength of only 71 men, was attacked by a Viet Cong battalion of vastly superior strength. The 883D Company withstood repeated enemy assaults, all of which were supported by intense mortar and recoilless rifle fire. Through the morning this unit made its gallant stand unaided by outside fire support. The company had sustained over 30 killed in action or seriously wounded and had nearly exhausted its ammunition and grenades. The members of the company were undaunted and proceeded to break out of the cordon. Following a break-out, the unit joined with a larger force and proceed to counterattack the battalion. The counterattack was successful in driving the enemy from the area. The dogged defense of Ha Tay by the 883D Regional Force Company resulted in the death Of 221 Viet Cong and the capture of two machine guns.

1st Engineer Battalion

Presidential Unit Citation for actions between 1 January 1967 and 25 February 1968, DAGO 23, 69.

==== 161 Battery, Royal New Zealand Artillery, Vietnam, 1965–1966 ====
Between May 1965 and June 1966, 161 Battery, 16 Field Regiment, Royal New Zealand Artillery served as part of the US 173rd Airborne Brigade in Vietnam. For its service throughout this period, 161 Battery, RNZA were awarded the United States Meritorious Unit Commendation.

Personnel who were posted to the unit during the period for which the citation was awarded are entitled to permanently wear the United States Army Meritorious Unit Commendation on the right breast.

==== Australian Army Training Team Vietnam, 1962–1969 ====
For the service it provided during the Vietnam War between 1962 and 1969, the Australian Army Training Team Vietnam was awarded the United States Meritorious Unit Commendation. The commendation is indicated by a red streamer bearing the honour 'Vietnam 1962–69'.

==== No. 2 Squadron, Royal Australian Air Force ====
For its service in Vietnam between April 1967 and May 1971, No. 2 Squadron, Royal Australian Air Force was awarded the United States Air Force Outstanding Unit Award with attached Valor device.

==== Royal Australian Navy in Vietnam ====
For their service during the Vietnam War, both HMAS Perth and HMAS Hobart of the Royal Australian Navy were awarded commendations. The Perth was awarded both the Navy Unit Commendation and the Meritorious Unit Commendation while the Hobart received the Navy Unit Commendation.

The RAN's Clearance Diving Team 3 was awarded the US Presidential Unit Citation, twice awarded the Navy Unit Commendation for the periods January 1, 1968, to December 31, 1970, whilst part of Explosive Ordnance Disposal Mobile Unit, Pacific (EODMUPAC) and June 1, 1969, to November 25, 1970, as a unit of Inshore Undersea Warfare Group One (IUWG1), and the Meritorious Unit Commendation for its work clearing the harbours of Vung Tau, Cam Ranh Bay, Qui Nhon, and Nha Trang between February 19 and June 30, 1967.

=== Operation Enduring Freedom in Afghanistan ===
==== Task Force K-Bar ====
On December 7, 2004, at a private ceremony in California, President George W. Bush presented the Navy Presidential Unit Citation to the members of Combined Joint Special Operations Task Force-SOUTH/Task Force K-Bar (CJSOTF-SOUTH/TF K-BAR). Task Force K-Bar was a Navy SEAL-led unit that served in Afghanistan as part of Operation Enduring Freedom from October 2001 to March 2002, and it was decorated for "outstanding courage, resourcefulness, and aggressive fighting spirit in combat against a well equipped, well trained and treacherous terrorist enemy". Task Force K-Bar was "joint" in that it included members of more than one service – Army Special Forces, Air Force combat controllers as well as Navy special warfare personnel – and "combined" in that it included military personnel from several countries. Besides United States personnel, special operations personnel from the following countries and units participated, earning the Navy Presidential Unit Citation.

- Canadian Joint Task Force 2 (JTF2): The contingent of Canada's special operations unit, JTF2, which served in Task Force K-Bar was awarded the Navy Presidential Unit Citation for their service in Afghanistan. The Canadian Department of National Defence announced the award on December 8, 2004. After the necessary country to country diplomatic notes were exchanged to make and accept the award on June 2, 2006, the Department of National Defence announced that the U.S. Ambassador to Canada had presented the citation to the members of JTF2.
- Danish Special Forces: In February 2005, the Danish armed forces command announced the receipt of the Navy Presidential Unit Citation by Danish members of the Frømandskorpset ("Frogman Corps", the Danish naval special operations unit) and the Jægerkorpset ("Hunter Corps", the Danish army special operations unit). Danish representatives were reportedly present at the December 7, 2004, ceremony with the U.S. president.
- German Special Forces: Members of Germany's Kommando Spezialkräfte, or KSK, served with Task Force K-Bar. The award of the Presidential Unit Citation is noted on the U.S. Navy's unit awards database, but confirmation of acceptance of the award by Germany's Bundeswehr on behalf of the highly secretive KSK has not been made public.
- New Zealand Special Air Service: The New Zealand Special Air Service, was awarded the Navy Presidential Unit Citation for its participation in Task Force K-Bar's operations in Afghanistan. Lt. Colonel Peter Kelly, the commanding officer of the 1st NZSAS Group, represented the unit at the December 7, 2004, awards ceremony. Formal approval for wear came from the Queen in June 2005.
- Norwegian Special Forces: At a private ceremony in Oslo, Norway, on February 8, 2005, U.S. Ambassador to Norway John Doyle Ong presented the Navy Presidential Unit Citation on behalf of the U.S. president to members of Norway's special forces who served with Task Force K-Bar. Norwegian armed forces chief of staff General Sigurd Frisvold also participated in the ceremony. Norwegian special forces from the Royal Norwegian Army's Hærens Jegerkommando and the Royal Norwegian Navy's Marinejegerkommandoen served in Afghanistan from December 2001 to April 2002.
- Turkish special forces: The release noting the unit citation to Task Force K-Bar mentions Turkey among the other coalition members, and the U.S. Navy's unit citation database lists one or more Turkish liaison personnel among persons entitled to the unit citation, but little more has been publicly disclosed about the role of Turkish special operations forces in Task Force K-Bar's operations in Afghanistan.
- Although not a part of Task Force K-Bar the Australian Special Air Service Regiment was also awarded the Presidential Unit Citation. The Presidential Unit Citation was the third to an Australian unit, joining the Army PUC awarded to 3rd Battalion, Royal Australian Regiment in the Korean War and the Army PUC awarded to D Company, 6th Battalion, Royal Australian Regiment in the Vietnam War.

All of the eligible personnel of these units who served in Task Force K-Bar were awarded the unit citation. However, acceptance and wear of the award is subject to the rules and regulations of each of these countries' armed forces.

=== Operation Iraqi Freedom/Iraq War ===
==== Presidential Unit Citation to British units attached to 1st MEF ====
The U.S. I Marine Expeditionary Force (1st MEF), consisting of the 1st Marine Division and attached units, received the Navy Presidential Unit Citation for its actions in combat in Iraq from March 21 to April 24, 2003. Among the attached and supporting units cited were the following British units:

- 1st (UK) Armoured Division (−)(Reinforced)
  - 7th Armoured Brigade
    - 1st Battalion The Black Watch (Royal Highland Regiment)
    - 1st Battalion The Royal Regiment of Fusiliers
    - The Royal Scots Dragoon Guards (Carabiniers and Greys)
    - 2nd Royal Tank Regiment
    - 3rd Regiment Royal Horse Artillery
    - 32nd Engineer Regiment
  - 16th Air Assault Brigade
    - 1st Battalion The Parachute Regiment
    - 3rd Battalion The Parachute Regiment
    - 1st Battalion The Royal Irish Regiment (27th (Inniskilling), 83rd, 87th and Ulster Defence Regiment)
    - 7th Parachute Regiment Royal Horse Artillery
  - 3 Commando Brigade (−)
    - 40 Commando, Royal Marines
    - 42 Commando, Royal Marines
    - 29 Commando Regiment Royal Artillery
