= Nguyễn Qúy An =

Vietnamese Air Force major

Nguyễn Quý An
- Born: January 18, 1943 (age 83); Viet Nam
- Military career
- Branch: Republic of Vietnam Air Force
- Rank: Major (Thiếu Tá)
- Conflicts: Vietnam War
- Awards: Distinguished Flying Cross

Nguyễn Qúy An (born January 18, 1943) is a former Major in the Republic of Vietnam Air Force who risked his life to rescue four Americans in a downed chopper while he was on a different mission. For his actions he was awarded the United States Distinguished Flying Cross and Silver Star. In a subsequent combat mission he lost both of his arms when his helicopter was shot down during a combat mission.

In 1962 An graduated from high school in Saigon. He served as a helicopter pilot in the Republic of Vietnam Air Force from 1963 to 1974, and received some of his training at Fort Rucker, Alabama and Fort Wolters, Texas. He flew numerous combat missions in support of American and South Vietnamese troops in Vietnam. He made three attempts to escape Vietnam, but was apprehended each time and imprisoned.

== Awards | Distinguished Flying Cross - Cited for Silver Star ==
For the 17 January 1969 rescue he was awarded the U.S. Distinguished Flying Cross and was cited for the Silver Star.'

=== Distinguished Flying Cross ===
On 4 June 1969, Headquarters, U.S. Military Assistance Command, Vietnam, announced the award of the Distinguished Flying Cross to then-Captain Nguyễn Qúy An (General Orders Number 2913) for heroism while participating in aerial flight on 17 January 1969. The award was presented on 14 June 1969.

While leading a flight of the 219th Squadron (“King Bees”), 41st Wing, Vietnamese Air Force, An inserted Special Forces personnel into a landing zone in Laos. When a U.S. Army helicopter was hit in the fuel cell, An dove to intercept it, vectored the crew to a suitable clearing under enemy fire, landed beside the crippled aircraft, and waited while his crew chief cut a path so the four Americans could reach his helicopter. He then flew them to safety.

He was also cited for the Silver Star for the same action.

== Political asylum granted by the United States ==
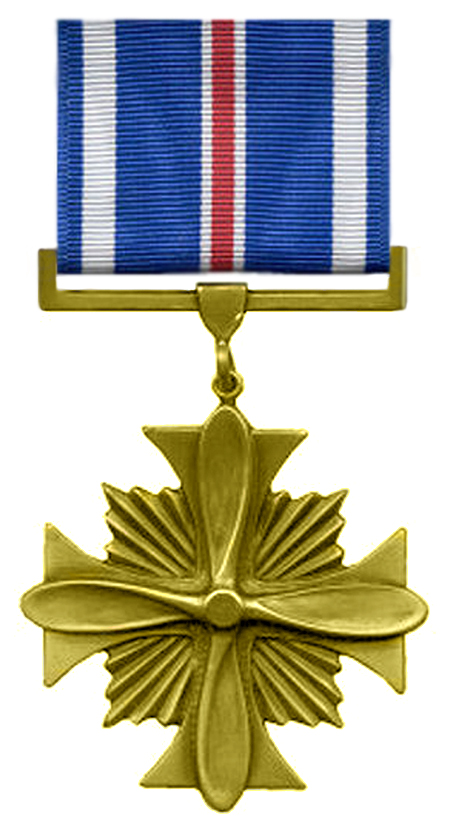
Distinguished Flying Cross (United States)

The United States passed special laws designed to help South Vietnamese who had experienced special hardship during the war to immigrate to the United States. One provision of this law is that those South Vietnamese who spent a year or more in North Vietnamese "re-education camps" were allowed to enter the United States by special provision. However, because of his amputated arms, Major An was released from such a camp after only nine weeks, and so did not qualify. What he had done for his American comrades-in-arms was ignored under the standard resettlement criteria. After extensive advocacy by veterans, Vietnamese-American supporters, and members of Congress, An and his daughter were admitted to the United States in January 1994 on temporary humanitarian parole.

Permanent status required private legislation. Representative Zoe Lofgren (D-CA) introduced H.R. 1087 in February 1995. The bill waived ordinary naturalization requirements and allowed An to apply for citizenship. It passed both chambers and was enacted as Private Law 104-4 on October 19, 1996. An became a U.S. citizen on October 31, 1996.

A parallel private bill had been introduced by Representative Norman Mineta earlier in 1995; Lofgren’s measure was the one that became law.

After a special law was enacted, Major An was granted legal residency and later citizenship on October 31, 1996. However, this special consideration did not apply to his daughter, Nguyen Ngoc Kim Quy, who takes care of him, and additional efforts had to be made before she was able to come to the United States.

He now lives in San Jose.

== See also ==
- Nguyen Van Kiet - Petty Officer Third Class in the Republic of Vietnam Navy recipient of the Navy Cross.
- Tran Van Bay, Army of the Republic of Vietnam - Private First Class Tran was posthumously awarded the Navy Cross for heroism after he sacrificed his life to save a U.S. Marine on February 19, 1967.
