= Trần Văn Bảy =

Tran Van Bay
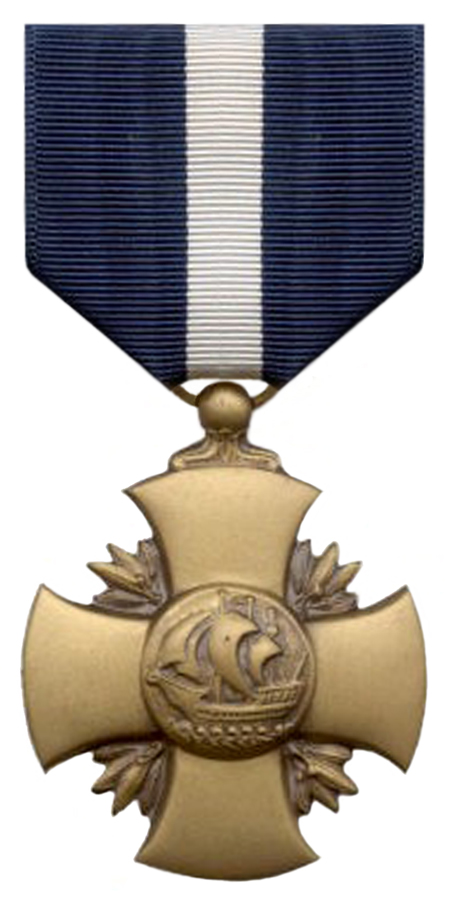
- Navy Cross
- Born: Vietnam
- Died: February 19, 1967; Hiệp Đức District, Quảng Nam Province, Republic of Vietnam
- Military career
- Allegiance: (South Vietnam) Republic of Vietnam
- Branch: (South Vietnam) Army of the Republic of Vietnam
- Rank: Private First Class
- Units: 3rd Company, 3rd Battalion, 51st Regiment, South Vietnamese Army
- Conflicts: Vietnam War
- Awards: Navy Cross

Trần Văn Bảy was a Private First Class of the Army of the Republic of Vietnam who was awarded the Navy Cross for actions on February 19, 1967, during the Vietnam War. Bảy was one of only two South Vietnamese, and the only South Vietnamese soldier, to receive the Navy Cross during the Vietnam War (the other being Nguyễn Văn Kiệt).

== Navy Cross citation ==
The President of the United States takes pride in presenting the Navy Cross posthumously to

TRAN VAN BAY, PRIVATE FIRST CLASS

ARMY OF THE REPUBLIC OF VIETNAM

Citation:

For extraordinary heroism in connection with operations against insurgent Communist (Viet Cong) forces while serving with the 3rd Company, 3rd Battalion, 51st Regiment, Army of the Republic of Vietnam. Private First Class Tran Van Bay heroically sacrificed his life to prevent serious injury or death to an American comrade. Situated with his unit along a road in Hieu Duc District, Quang Nam Province, Private First Class Tran and his fellow Vietnamese soldiers were taken under sudden intense rifle and automatic weapons fire from an unknown number of Viet Cong. The men of G Company, Second Battalion, 4th Marines, in pursuit of an assigned objective, were simultaneously moving along the road amidst the Vietnamese soldiers when their advance was halted by the same heavy fire. Taking immediate cover off the side of the road, Marines and friendly Vietnamese alike prepared to return the fire which was now sporadic. Private First Class Tran, in close proximity to Private First Class Samuel R. Vitello, U.S. Marine Corps, observed a "booby trap" which threatened the life of the Marine. Without hesitation and with utter disregard for his own safety, Private First Class Tran violently pushed the Marine from the path of the instrument of death which was instantly activated. In performing this selfless act, the dauntless Tran exposed himself to the full blast of the explosive. As a direct result of this intrepid action, Private First Class Vitello escaped with painful but minor wounds in contrast with the Vietnamese soldier who was mortally wounded. Private First Class Tran's devotion to duty and magnificent display of uncommon valor were in keeping with the highest traditions of the United States and the Republic of Vietnam. He gallantly gave his life in the service of the Free World Military Forces.

== See also ==
- Nguyễn Văn Kiệt – Petty Officer Third Class, Republic of Vietnam Navy; also awarded the Navy Cross
- Nguyễn Qúy An – Major, Vietnam Air Force; awarded United States Distinguished Flying Cross
