= Garry Cooper (pilot) =

Decorated pilot from the Royal Australian Air Force

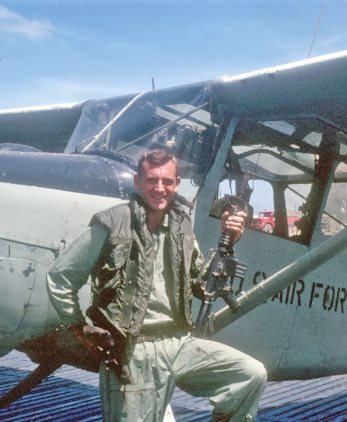
- Cooper in Vietnam in 1968
- Born: 21 January 1938; Adelaide, South Australia
- Died: 17 May 2026 (aged 88); Newcastle, New South Wales
- Spouse: Jean Cooper
- Military career
- Allegiance: Australia
- Branch: Royal Australian Air Force
- Service years: 1960–1969
- Rank: Flight Lieutenant
- Conflicts: Indonesia–Malaysia confrontation Vietnam War
- Awards: Distinguished Flying Cross; Air Force Cross (United States); Silver Star (United States); Distinguished Flying Cross (with V Device, United States); Bronze Star Medal (with V Device, United States); Cross of Gallantry (South Vietnam)
- Other work: Airline Captain (1969–2000)

Garry Gordon Cooper, DFC (born 21 January 1938) was a retired airline captain and a former fighter pilot in the Royal Australian Air Force (RAAF) who attained the rank of flight lieutenant. Cooper served on assignment with the United States Air Force (USAF) as a Forward Air Controller (FAC) in South Vietnam. Whilst working as a FAC in 1968, he was assigned to support the United States Army's 9th Infantry Division. For his heroic actions in Vietnam, Cooper was awarded the Imperial Distinguished Flying Cross and was twice awarded the United States Air Force Cross, a Silver Star and the United States Distinguished Flying Cross for heroism.

== Early life ==
Garry Cooper was born on 21 January 1938 in Adelaide, South Australia. His basic education was at various primary schools around Adelaide and he matriculated from the School of Mines and Industries. Postgraduate, he completed a Diploma in Aeronautical Engineering. Cooper gained his Silver "C" glider pilot's licence at the age of sixteen before taking up powered flying. At the age of nineteen, Cooper gained his commercial pilot licence and obtained employment with the Flying Doctor Service in Central Australia. He subsequently gained employment with Gibbes Sepik Airways in New Guinea where he flew the Norseman UC-64A, Junkers Ju 52, de Havilland DH84 and various Cessna aircraft. After flying in New Guinea for three years, Cooper was selected to start pilot training with the Royal Australian Air Force (RAAF).

== Royal Australian Air Force pilot ==
Cooper joined the Royal Australian Air Force (RAAF) on 11 March 1960 to commence pilot training on No. 39 Pilots' Course with twenty other trainee pilots. Only eleven passed the course. Upon graduation, he received the Most Proficient Pilot award. After graduation and gaining his wings, Cooper was first posted to the School of Air Navigation flying the Dakota C-47, Canberra, Vampire and Winjeel aircraft. This tour was interrupted with two tours to Antarctica in support of the Australian Antarctic Division where he flew the Beaver DHC-2 on floats and skis from the Danish ship Thala Dan.

In 1962 Cooper was posted to fly the Commonwealth Aircraft Corporation (CAC) Avon Sabre fighter aircraft, the Australian variant of the North American F-86 Sabre. Cooper served operational tours on the Sabre in Thailand, Borneo and Malaysia. During one mission, operating out of RAAF Butterworth, Malaysia on 10 April 1964, Cooper experienced an engine fire indication in his single-engine Sabre. After shutting the engine down and being too far away to glide back to the airfield at Butterworth, he conducted a safe 'glide landing' at Bayan Lapas on the island of Penang. On 3 January 1966, Cooper commenced his Mirage IIIO fighter conversion course on No. 5 Mirage Course at No. 2 Operational Conversion Unit (2OCU). The Mirage had only commenced service in the RAAF in October 1964 and was the first Australian fighter jet capable of flying at speeds over Mach 2. On 30 May 1966, approximately one minute after takeoff from RAAF Base Williamtown, Cooper experienced a total engine failure in his Mirage whilst climbing through only 1,500 feet (460 m) at 380 knots. Cooper was unable to restart the engine. Being a single-engine fighter jet, Cooper flew the Mirage like a glider and landed on an abandoned war-time airstrip at Tomago (Hexam), New South Wales, without damaging the aircraft. The Mirage was towed back to RAAF Base Williamtown via local roads which took 14 hours. Subsequent investigations revealed that the Mirage had ingested a large bird that had lodged against the face of the compressor blocking airflow into the engine.

Wing Commander Jim Flemming, Commanding Officer of No. 75 Squadron, was leading the formation of two Mirages when Cooper experienced his engine failure. Flemming provided Cooper with a Flying Log Book endorsement, approved by the Air Officer Commanding Operational Command, which read:

"Flight Lieutenant Garry COOPER displayed a very high degree of professionalism throughout a difficult and dangerous situation and the manner in which he followed correct drills and procedures for the forced landing was exemplary. That he could assess and take advantage of so critical a situation in the time available and then bring the heavily loaded aircraft to a stop in such a short distance reflects credit on himself, his training and the RAAF." In 1999, Air Vice Marshall Flemming (retired) would add, "That Flt Lt Cooper landed his aircraft, without damage, on a short dis-used wartime strip was little short of incredible."

Cooper participated in some developmental testing for the Mirage III, where he evaluated flying with full pressure (space) suits. These pressure suits would enable the pilots to fly the Mirage up to altitudes over 75,000 feet (23,000 m) for conducting high altitude intercept missions – well above the normal maximum operating altitude of 50,000 feet (15,000 m).

== Vietnam War – Forward Air Controller ==
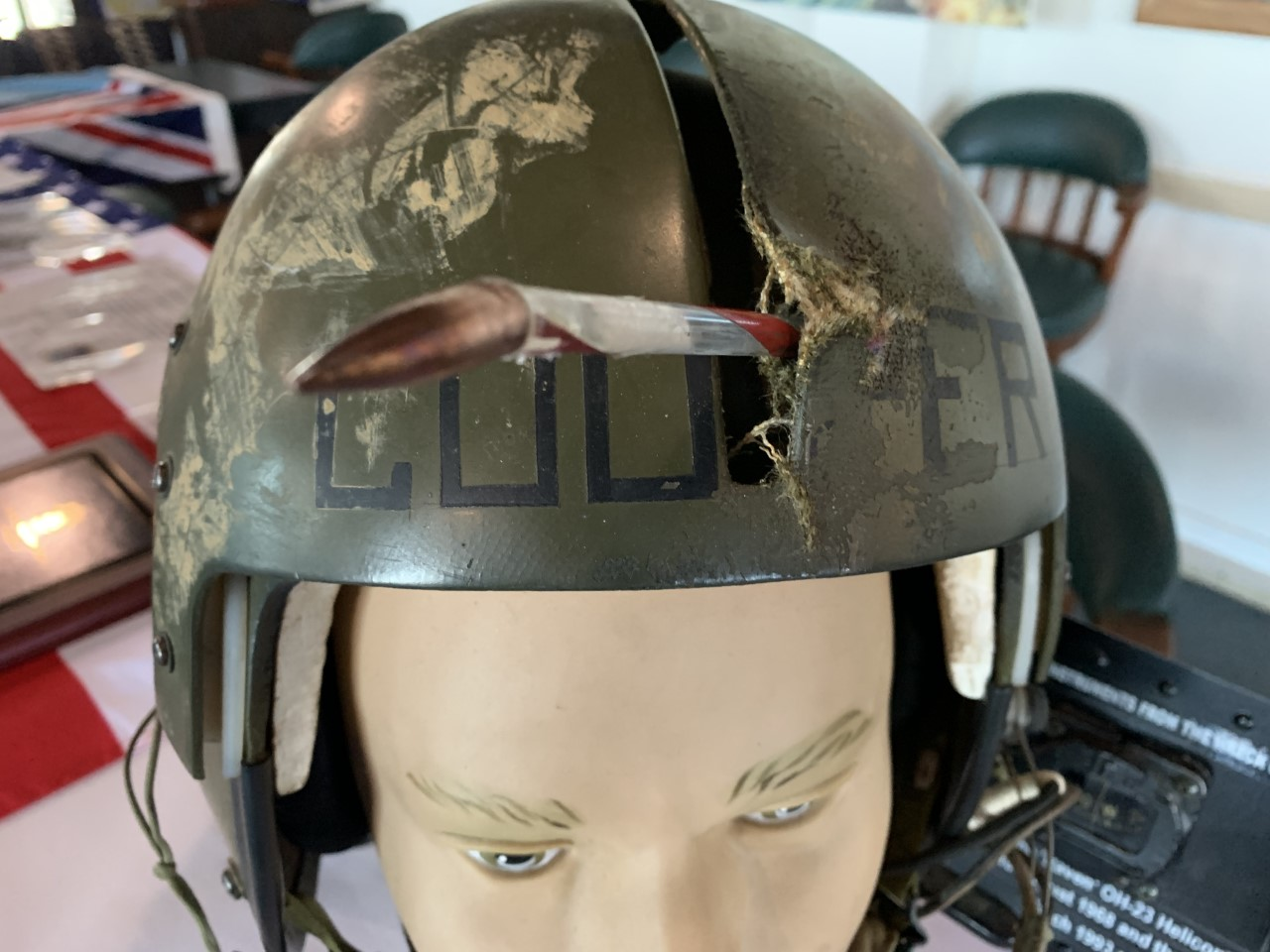
Flight Lieutenant Cooper's flying helmet from the Vietnam War on 18 August 1968. During a low flying combat mission, a bullet fired from the ground penetrated his helmet above his left ear. It travelled through the inside of his helmet, miraculously missing his head by 2cm, and exited out the front of his helmet above his forehead.

Cooper was posted to South Vietnam to serve as a Forward Air Controller (FAC) with the United States Air Force (USAF) from April to November 1968. Although he was an Australian fighter pilot, he served within a USAF unit, the 19th Tactical Air Support Squadron (TASS) detachment, a unit of the 504th Tactical Air Support Group, Seventh Air Force. The 19TASS headquarters was located at Bien Hoa Air Base. In this FAC role, where the overall mission is to coordinate tactical air support for the Army, Cooper was assigned to support the 3rd Brigade, 9th Infantry Division, US Army, under the command of Major General Julian Ewell. During his tour in South Vietnam, Cooper completed 323 combat missions totally 620 hours of combat flying. Between 1967 and 1971, 36 RAAF fighter pilots served as FAC pilots in Vietnam with the USAF.

Upon arrival in South Vietnam, Cooper was assigned the callsign 'Tamale 35' and would perform his FAC duties in the O-1 Bird Dog. Cooper was initially based at Tân An Base Camp, 40 km southwest of Saigon. Each day, FACs at Tan An would traverse the dangerous 6 km round trip in an open Jeep from the Base Camp to the Tan An airfield. Due to increased security risks in 1968, the 19TASS detachment relocated to Đồng Tâm Base Camp, 67 km southwest of Saigon on the Mekong River.

After his FAC training, Cooper was required to perform his missions during the height of the Vietnam War which saw some of the most intense operational periods of combat, notably the May Offensive or Mini-Tet of 1968. During the period 9–11 May, Cooper was flying around-the-clock missions at any time of day, typically for 3 to 4 hours in duration. On 11 May, Cooper had been awake for 19 1/2 hours, during which time he had been flying for 13 hours of which five of those hours were spent evading anti-aircraft fire during his missions.

In late October 1968, Cooper was assigned as a FAC Combat Instructor on the OV-10 Bronco prior to repatriating to Australia in November.

== Military awards ==
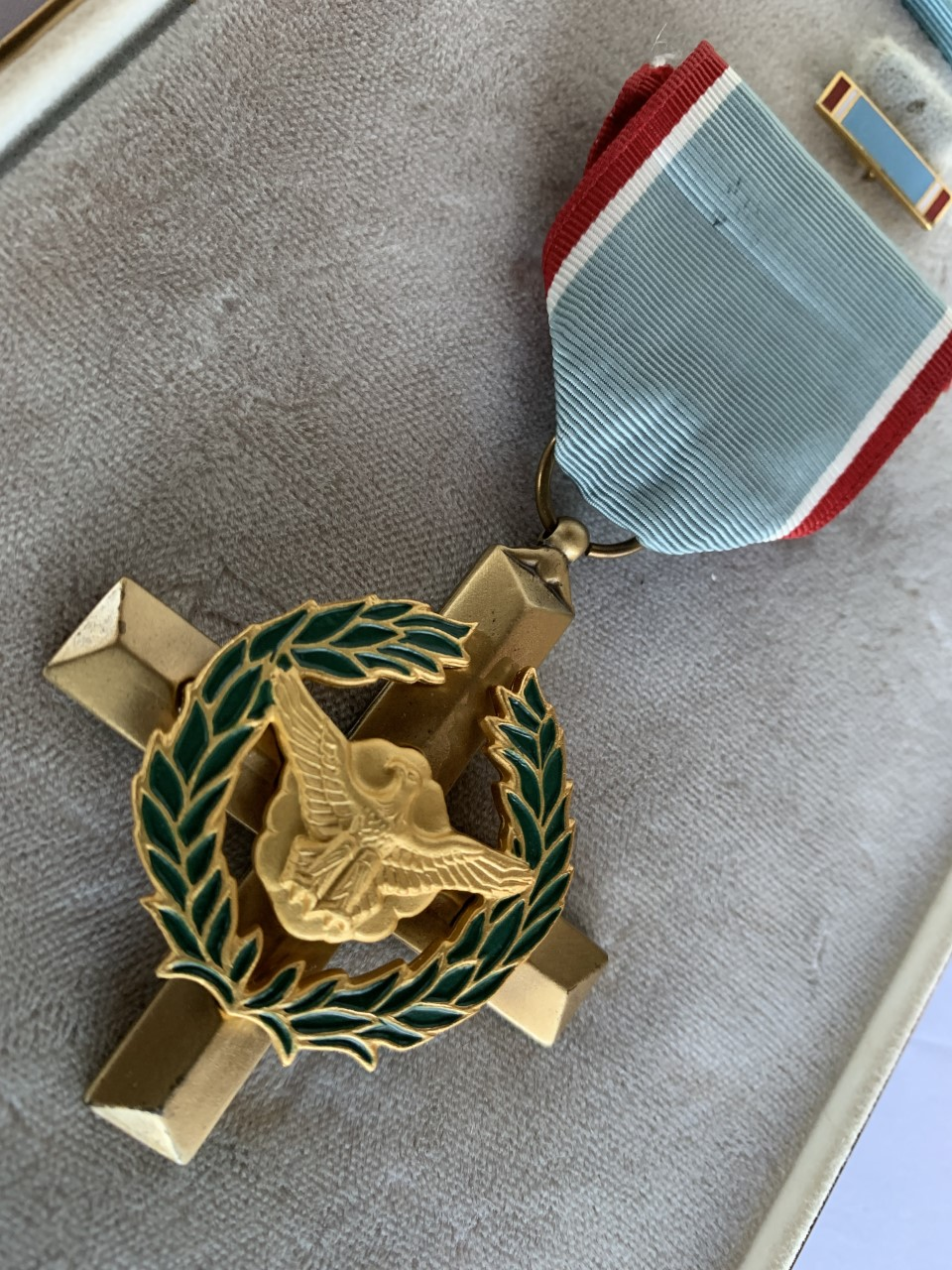
Garry Cooper's USAF Air Force Cross.

Cooper is the most highly decorated RAAF pilot to have served in the Vietnam War.

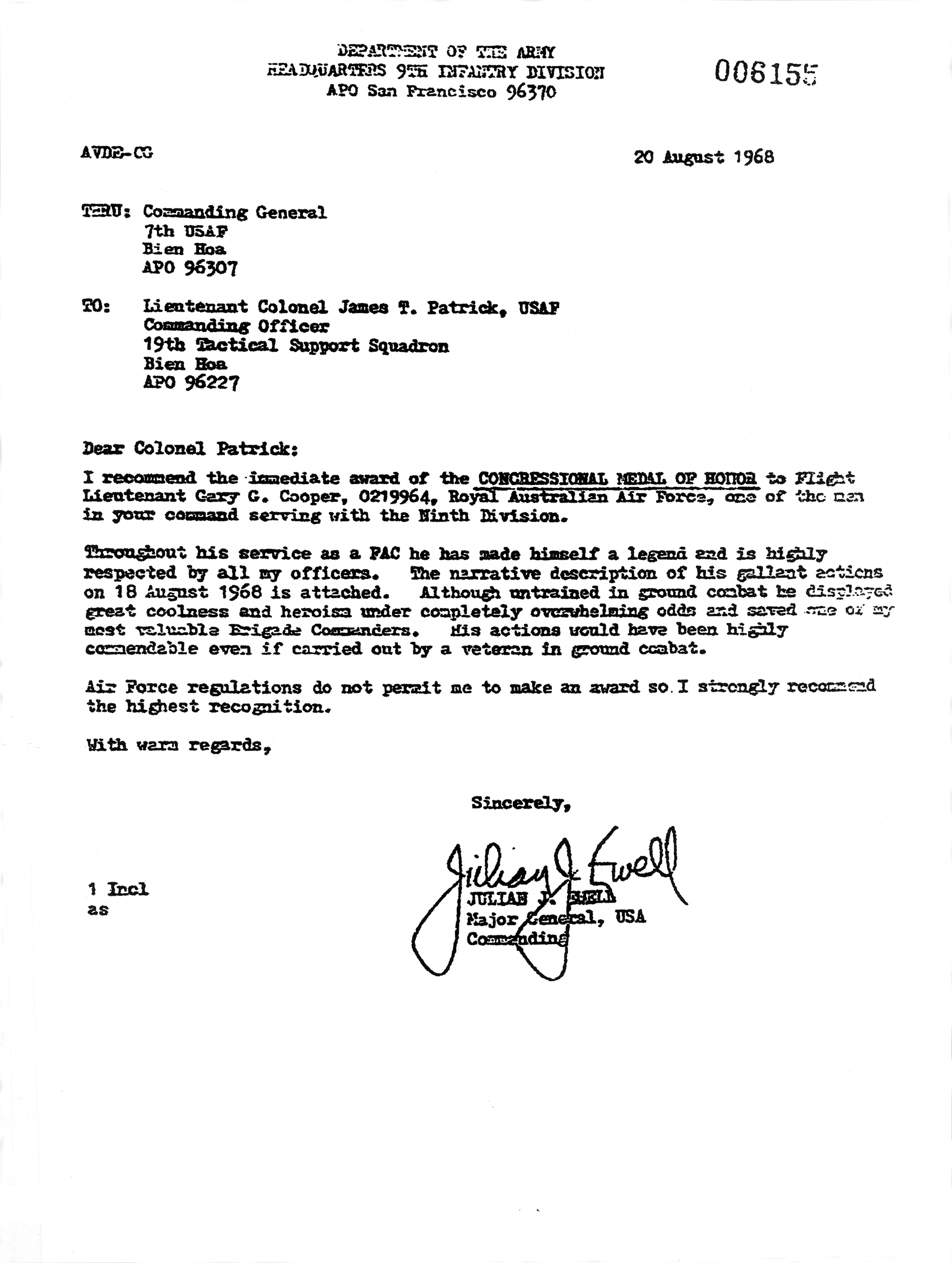
Major General Julian Ewell, Commander US Army's 9th Infantry Division, recommended Cooper for the Medal of Honor for his actions on 18 August 1968. Due to his ineligibility to receive the Medal of Honor as a non-US citizen, Cooper was subsequently awarded the next highest award, the Air Force Cross.

During his combat tour, Cooper's highest award was the USAF Air Force Cross which he received twice. The Air Force Cross is the second-highest USAF award after the Medal of Honor. Since the inception of the US Air Force Cross in 1960, only ~200 have been awarded. Cooper is the only non-US citizen to have been presented this award for his extraordinary heroism. Whilst awarded in 1981, Cooper had a special contemporary commemoration ceremony of this achievement at the Evans Head Returned and Services League (RSL) in New South Wales, Australia on 4 December 2021.

Cooper's second USAF Air Force Cross award citation for his actions on 18-19 Aug 1968 reads:

... for extraordinary heroism in military operations against an opposing armed force as a Forward Air Controller attached as an Air Liaison Officer to the 3rd Brigade, 9th Infantry Division, (US Army), on 18 August 1968 in the Republic of Vietnam. On that date, after being shot down in an OH-23 observation helicopter, Flight Lieutenant Cooper rescued a badly wounded Brigade Commander from the wreckage under extremely heavy automatic weapons fire. Although wounded himself, but with complete disregard of his own safety, he carried the Colonel to a protected area where he fought off several attempts to over-run them killing ten enemy soldiers at close range. During the helicopter rescue next day, he killed a further two enemy with his empty AR-15. Flight Lieutenant Cooper was solely responsible with the saving of Colonel Archer under over-whelming odds. Through his extraordinary heroism, superb airmanship and aggressiveness in the face of the enemy, Flight Lieutenant Cooper reflected the highest credit upon himself and the United States Air Force.

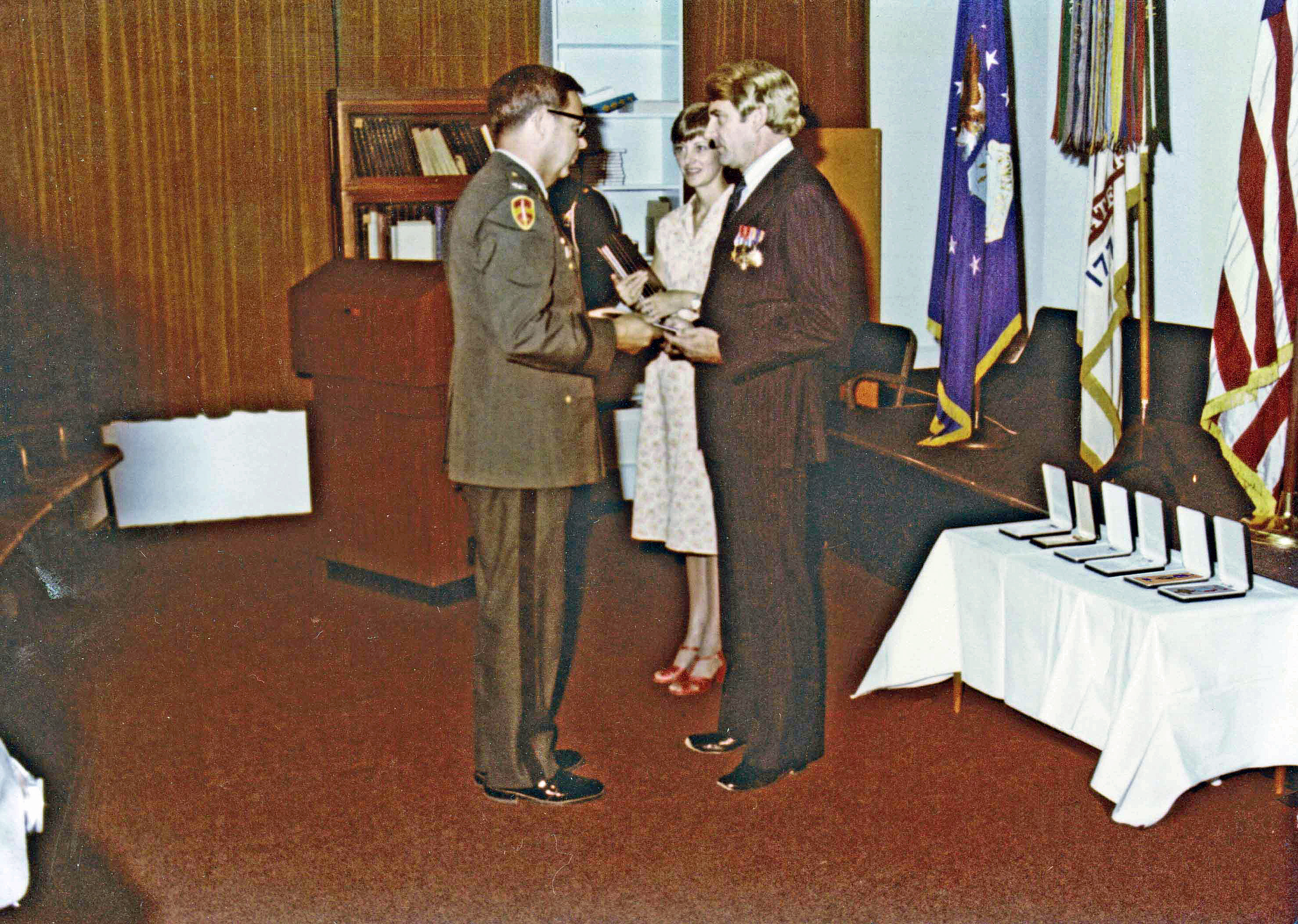
US Award Ceremony at US Embassy in Jeddah, Saudi Arabia, 16 May 1981. Hosted by US Defense Attache, Colonel Hollis D. Messer. He presented Cooper with an Air Force Cross, Silver Star, Distinguished Flying Cross for heroism, Bronze Star for heroism, Purple Heart and Air Medal for his 1st to 9th Oak Leaf Clusters.

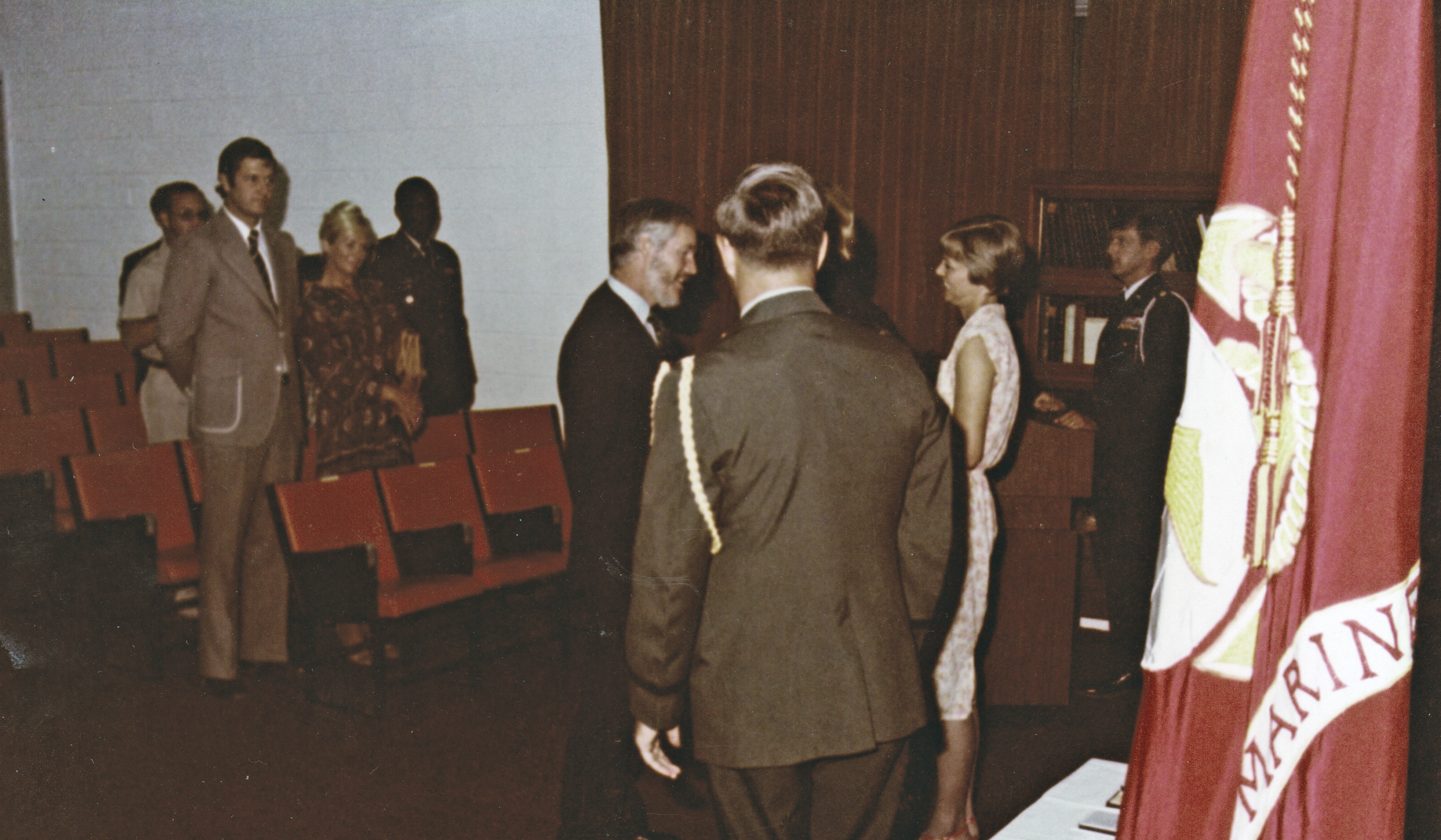
Given the prestigious high-level US awards presented to Cooper on 16 May 1981, Australian VIP, Ambassador Douglas Sturkey, was invited to attend on behalf of the Australian Government, shown here congratulating Cooper.

Only two other times in history has a US Service Cross for extraordinary heroism (Air Force Cross, Distinguished Service Cross, or Navy Cross) been awarded to a US foreign national. In 1918 during WW1, two French Soldiers fighting alongside the American Expeditionary Forces on the Western Front were both awarded two Distinguished Service Crosses; Major Charles M. Chanoine and Lieutenant Leon T. Marchand. The only US foreign national to receive two US Service Crosses since 1918 is Flight Lieutenant Cooper. Additionally, Cooper was also awarded many other US awards for heroism, including a Silver Star, the Distinguished Flying Cross for heroism, the Bronze Star Medal for heroism, an Air Medal for heroism from both the USAF and US Army, and an Army Commendation Medal for heroism. Cooper's vast collection of high-level US gallantry awards, and many other awards for heroism, make him the most highly decorated foreign national in history by the US Government.

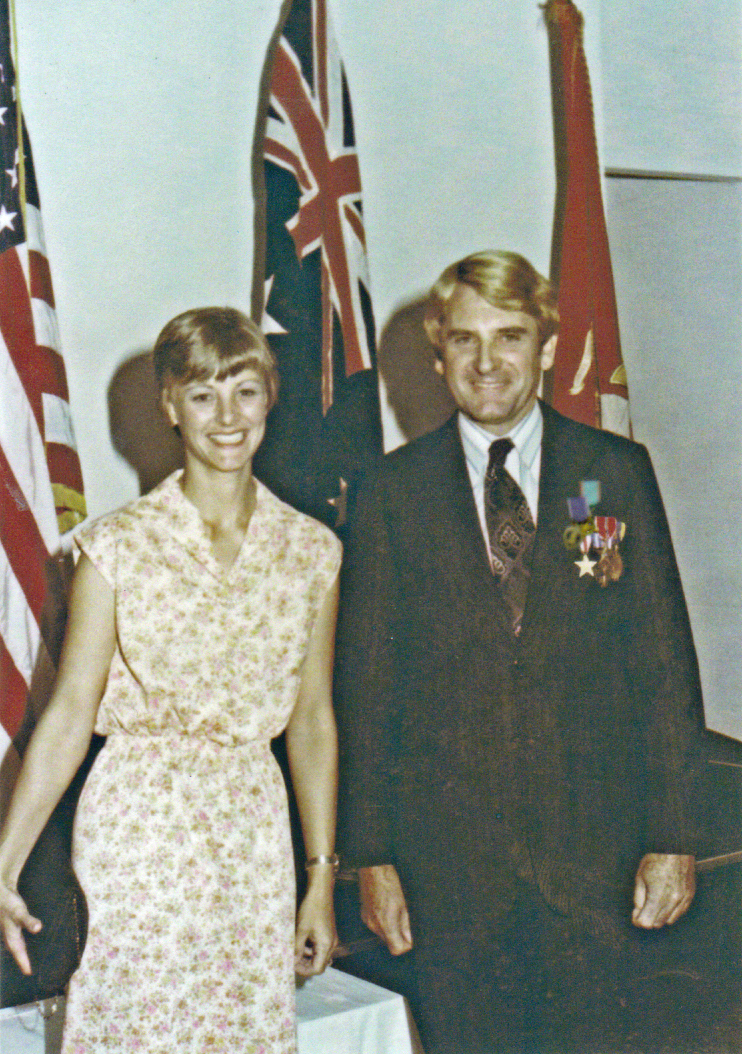
Garry Cooper – US medals award ceremony – US Embassy Jeddah 1981 with his wife Jean.

Cooper was also one of only a few RAAF pilots to be awarded the Air Force Ground Combat Badge.

Summary of awards:

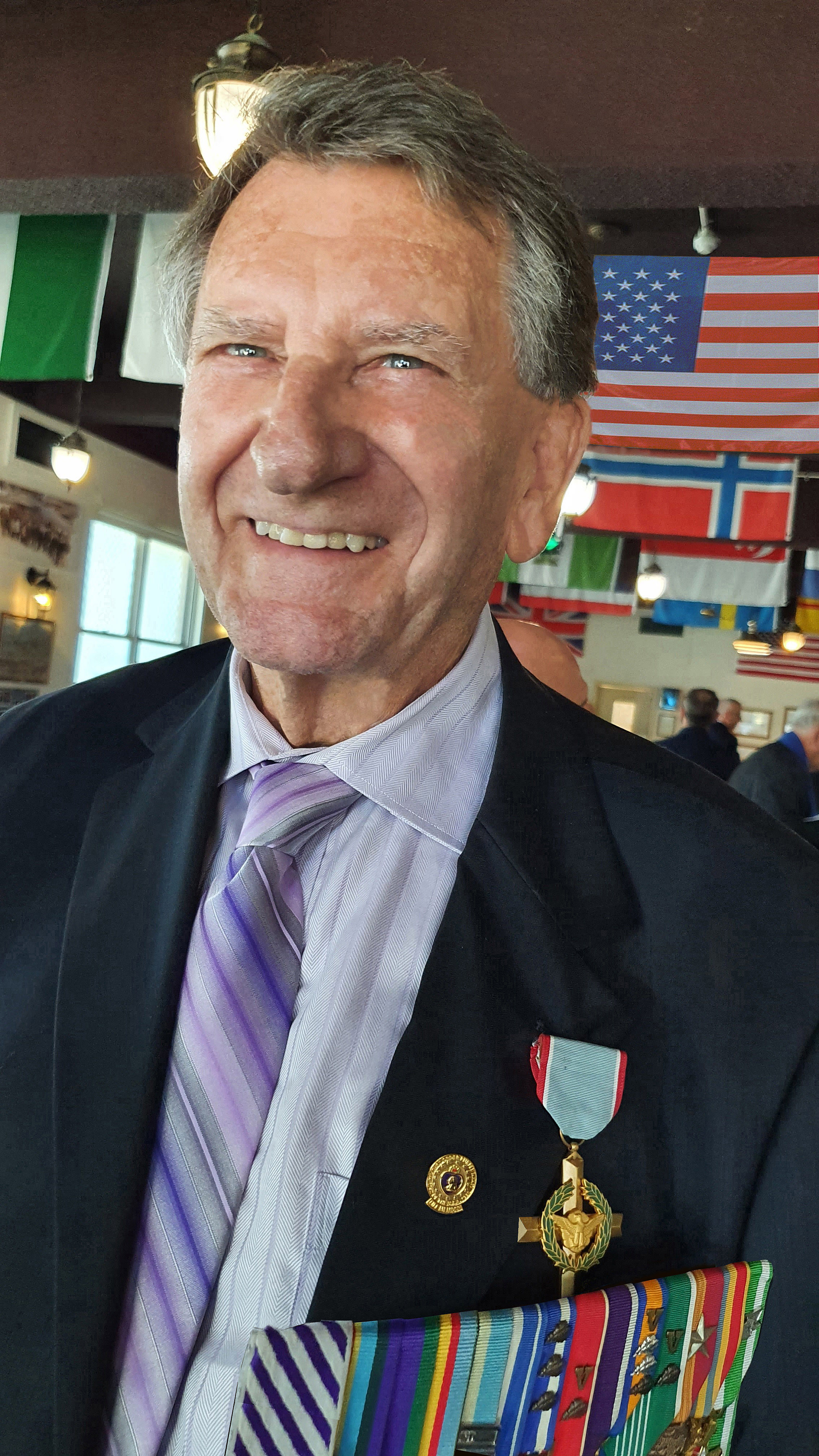
Garry Cooper DFC – Evans Head 4 Dec 2021, wearing US Air Force Cross.

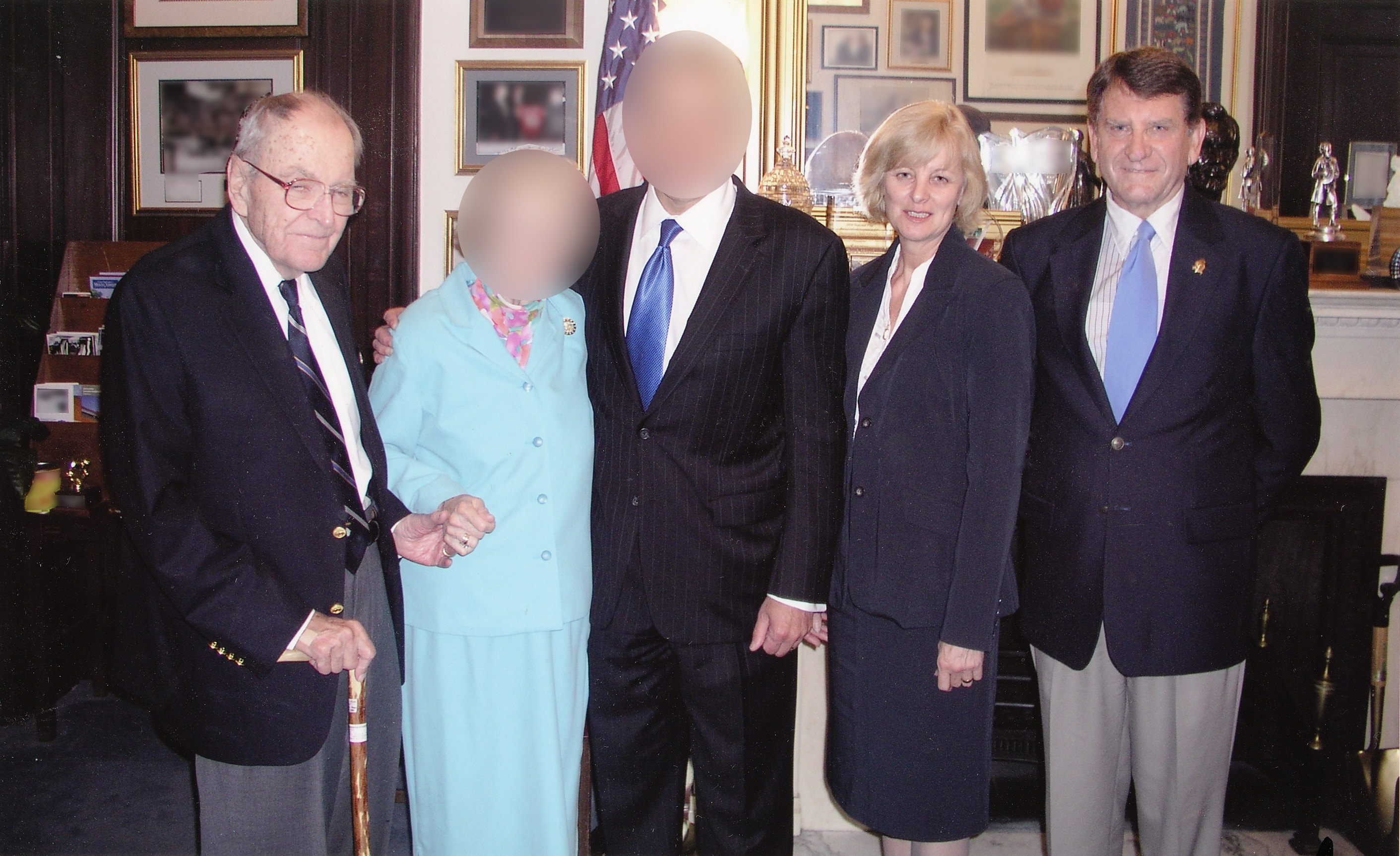
Lieutenant General Julian J Ewell (far left), US Army (Retd), meeting with Mr and Mrs Cooper. Ewell personally recommended Cooper for awards for his extraordinary heroic actions whilst supporting the 9th Infantry Division during the Vietnam War.

Foreign awards (United States)

- Air Force Cross (2) (the only non-US Citizen recipient and one of only 4 other multiple AFC recipients in history)
- Silver Star
- Distinguished Flying Cross(3 with "V" for Valor device)
- Bronze Star Medal (2, including 1 with "V" device)
- Purple Heart (2)
- Air Medal (15, including 2 with "V" device)
- Army Commendation Medal (2, including 1 with "V" device)
- Antarctica Service Medal
- US Presidential Unit Citation
- US Army Valorous Unit Award
- US Army Meritorious Unit Commendation

Foreign awards (Republic of Vietnam)

- Republic of Vietnam Campaign Medal
- Republic of Vietnam Gallantry Cross (with Silver Star)
- Republic of Vietnam Gallantry Cross (with Palm)
- Republic of Vietnam Wound Medal
- Vietnam Armed Forces Honor Medal (1st Class)
- Republic of Vietnam Gallantry Cross (with Palm Unit Citation)
- Republic of Vietnam Civil Actions Medal Unit Citation (US Army)

Foreign awards (Malaysia)

- Pingat Jasa Malaysia Medal

Australian / British Imperial Awards

- Distinguished Flying Cross
- Australian Active Service Medal (1945–1975) (Vietnam and Malaysia)
- General Service Medal (1962) (Borneo and Malay Peninsula)
- Vietnam Medal
- Australian Service Medal (1945–1975) (Thailand and Thai-Malay)
- Australian Defence Medal
- Ground Combat Badge

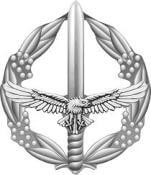

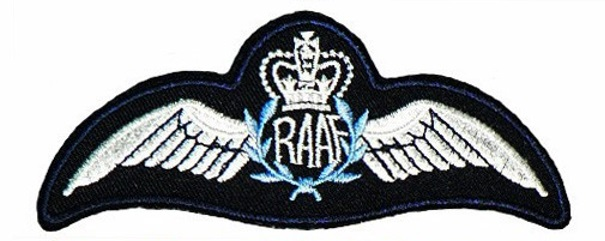

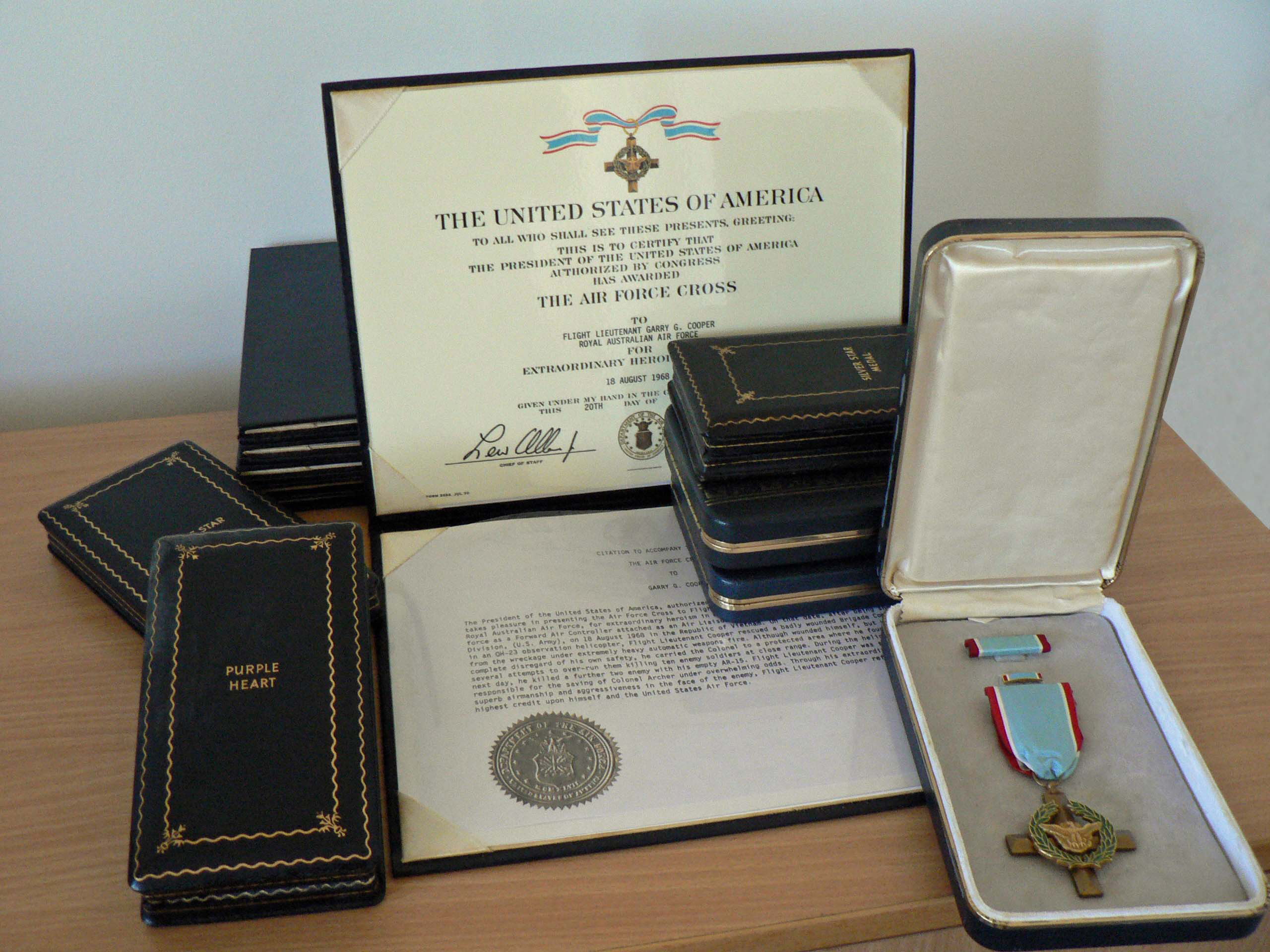
Collection of six new US awards presented to Cooper on 16 May 1981. Open are the certificate and citation for Cooper's Air Force Cross, along with the Air Force Cross medal. Cooper is the only foreign recipient of the US Air Force Cross. Awarded for extraordinary heroism for saving Colonel Robert E. Archer, Commander of the 2nd Brigade, 9th Infantry Division, after their helicopter was shot down on 18 Aug 1968.

== Author – 'Sock it to 'em Baby' ==
With co-author Robert Hillier, Garry Cooper wrote a book about his Vietnam experience in 1968. In 2006 the book was published under the title, Sock it to 'em Baby – Forward Air Controller in Vietnam.

== Gathering of Eagles Nomination ==
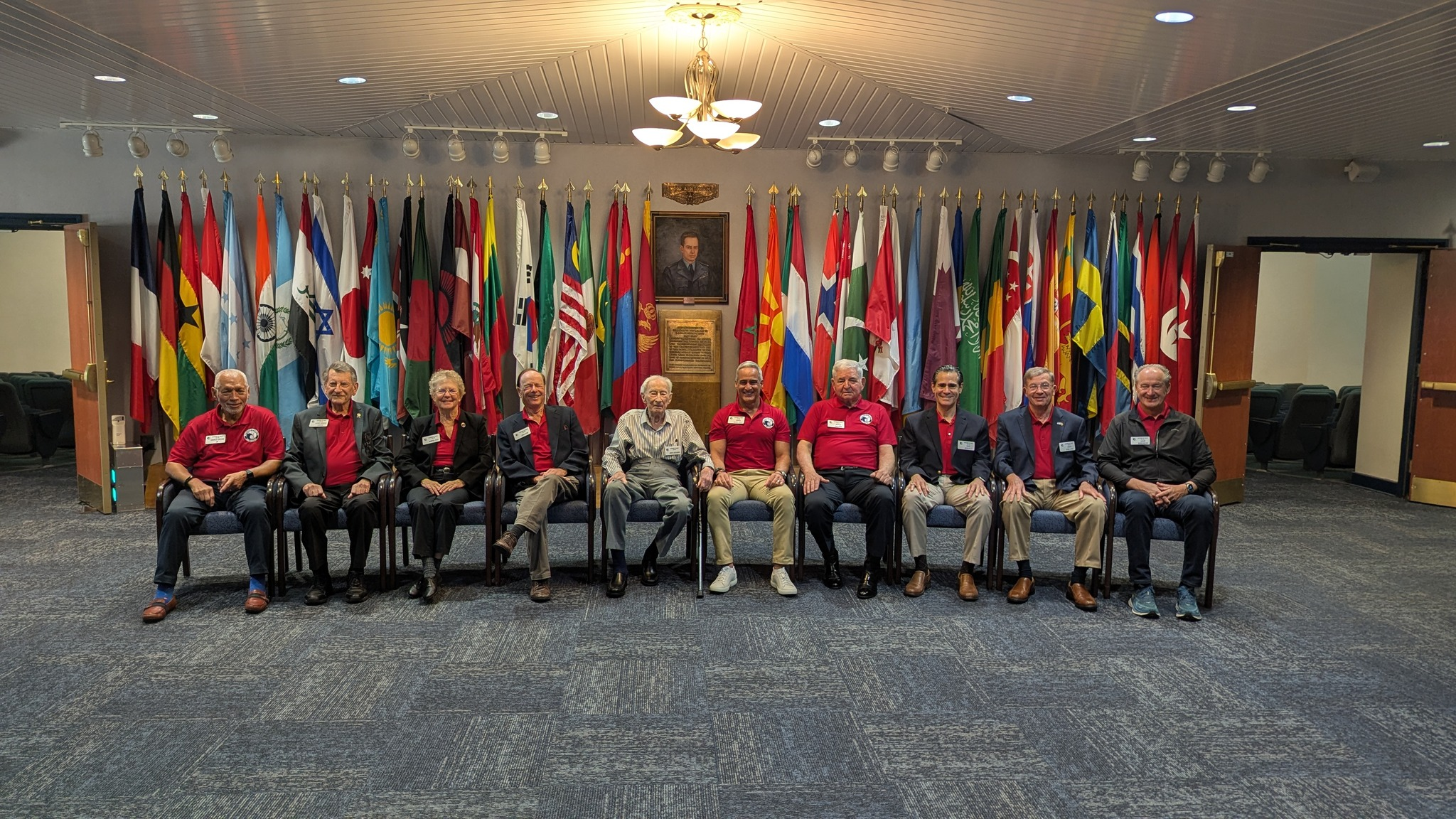
Gathering of Eagles Class of 2025. From left to right; MAJGEN Charles Bolden Jr, FLTLT Garry Cooper, John & Martha King, MAJ John Luckadoo, SEAC Ramon Colon-Lopez, GEN Ronald Fogleman, LTGEN Marc Sasseville, COL Charles DeBellevue and Andre Borschberg.

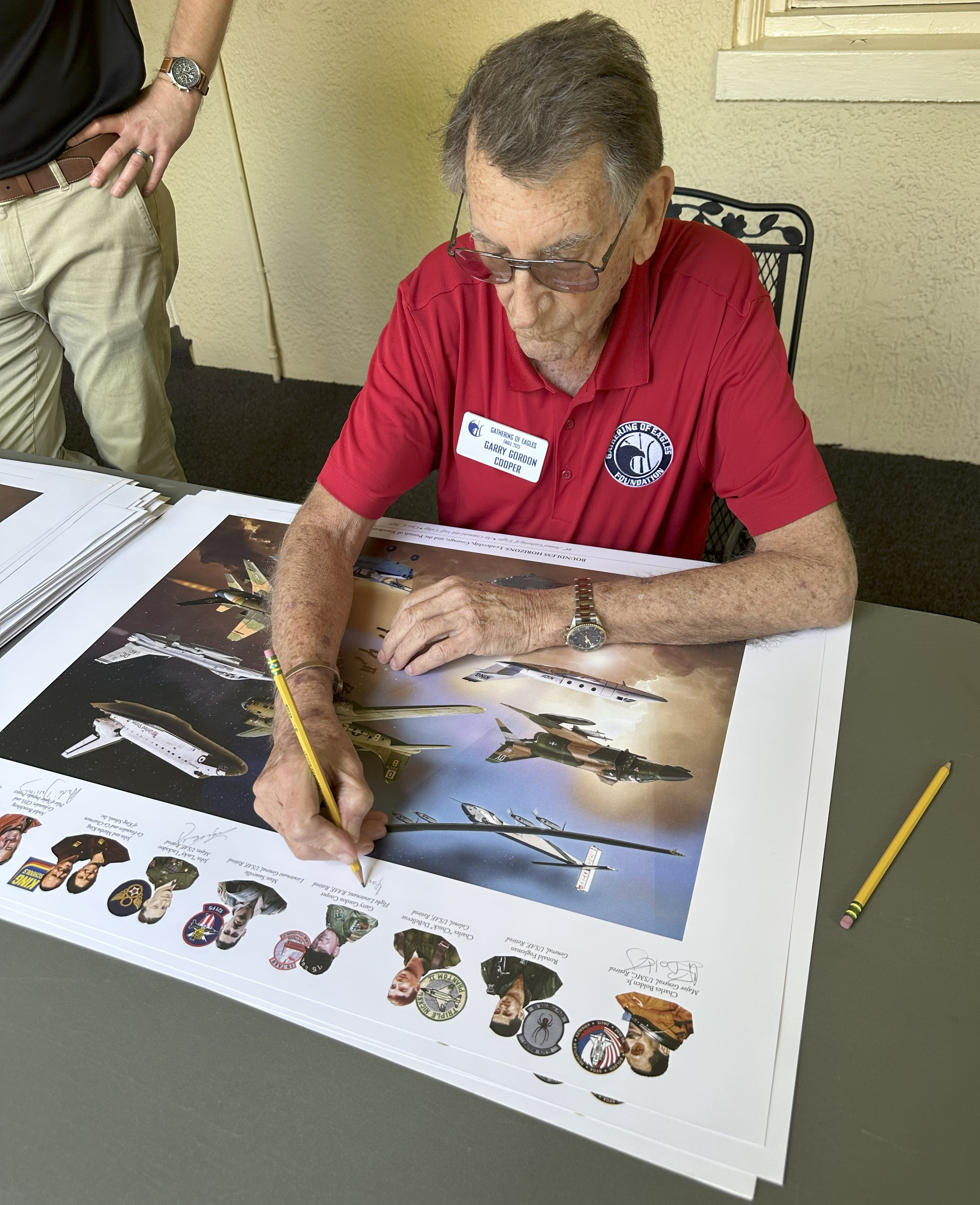
Garry Cooper signing official lithograph for the Gathering of Eagles Class of 2025.

Each year, the United States Air Force's Air Command and Staff College commemorates individuals who have made significant contributions to air, space and cyberspace power through their Gathering of Eagles Program. Nominees are given the title of 'Eagle'. For his lifelong contribution to aviation and for his heroic service to the USAF and US Army during the Vietnam War, Cooper was nominated as an Eagle for the Gathering of Eagles Class of 2025. Cooper was the first Australian to be nominated for this prestigious recognition. Cooper's official Gathering of Eagles video can be viewed here.

== Airline career ==
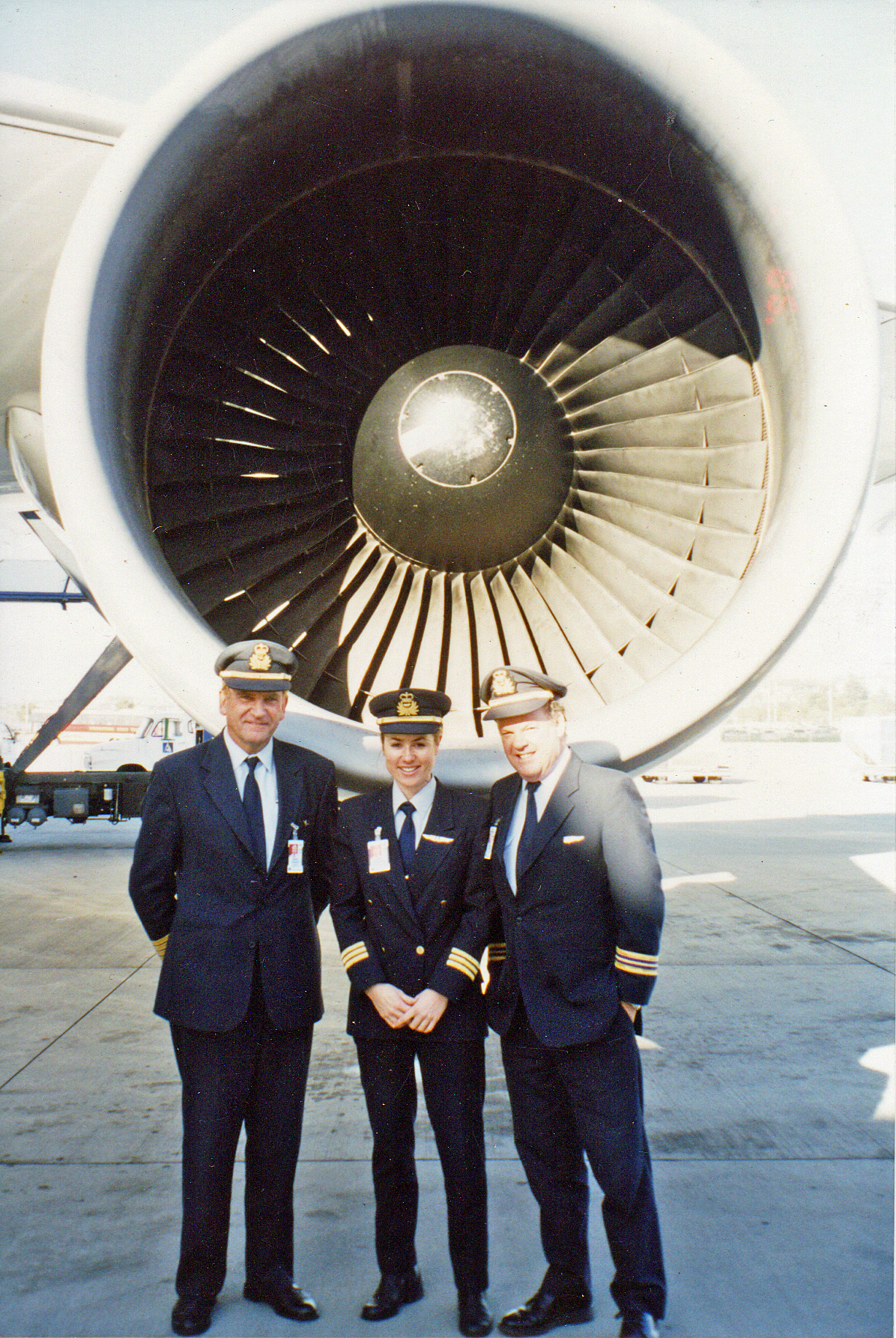
Garry Cooper – Last 747 Flight with Ansett

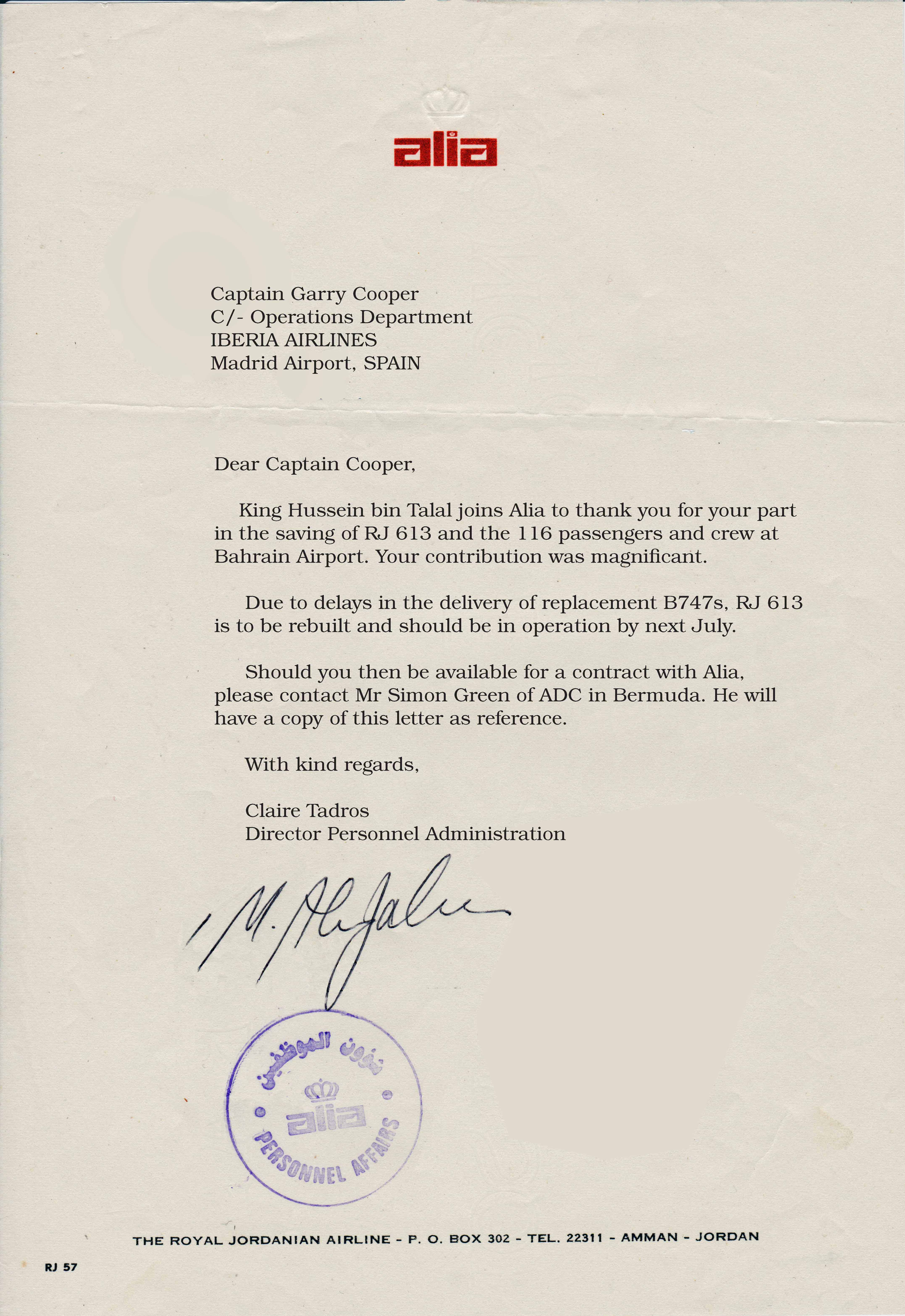
Thank you letter from Jordan's King Hussein bin Talal for saving 116 passengers and crew in 1980.

After returning from Vietnam, Cooper left the RAAF and took up employment as a co-pilot with Cathay Pacific Airways in Hong Kong, flying Convair 880 aircraft. Due to the rapid expansion of the airline, it took less than eighteen months for him to become a captain. With Cathay Pacific, Cooper advanced through the Boeing 707 and the Lockheed L1011 aircraft. After ten years in Hong Kong, Cooper then gained employment with Saudi Arabian Airlines as an L1011 Check Captain. Following two years in Jeddah, Saudi Arabia, he was offered employment with Kerry Packer, flying Packer's Learjet 35 around Australia on VIP operations carrying such dignitaries as Princess Diana and other world leaders. After several years, Cooper resumed flying as an international airline captain with Parc Aviation, flying Boeing 707 and Boeing 747 aircraft. Parc Aviation had crews and aircraft leased out to Lufthansa in Frankfurt, Caribbean Airlines in Paris, and Cargolux in Luxembourg. In 1980, Cooper flew the Boeing 707 for an aviation company that flew passengers for Alia (Royal Jordanian Airlines) based in Amman, Jordan. He received a notable commendation from King Hussein of Jordan for preventing a major airline accident, explained below in the 'Aviation Close Calls' section. In 1989 he landed a Boeing 747 at Martinique with 450 passengers and crew during Hurricane Hugo in wind speeds of 200 km/h. Cooper subsequently returned to Australia, gaining employment with Ansett Airlines flying Boeing 767 and Boeing 747 aircraft. As the post-traumatic stress disorder (PTSD) he had acquired from his Vietnam service became advanced, Cooper took retirement after accumulating over 25,000 hours of flying. In his retirement, Cooper continued flying various warbirds at airshows. Cooper was once the owner of a replica Japanese Zero fighter, which was based on a modified T-6 Harvard. This was the same aircraft used in the 1970 war movie, Tora! Tora! Tora!, which dramatised the Japanese attack on Pearl Harbor in 1941. Cooper performed a simulated attack display in the 'Zero' during the 2005 Australian International Airshow at the Avalon Airport as part of the 60-year commemoration since the end of the Second World War.

== Aviation incidents ==
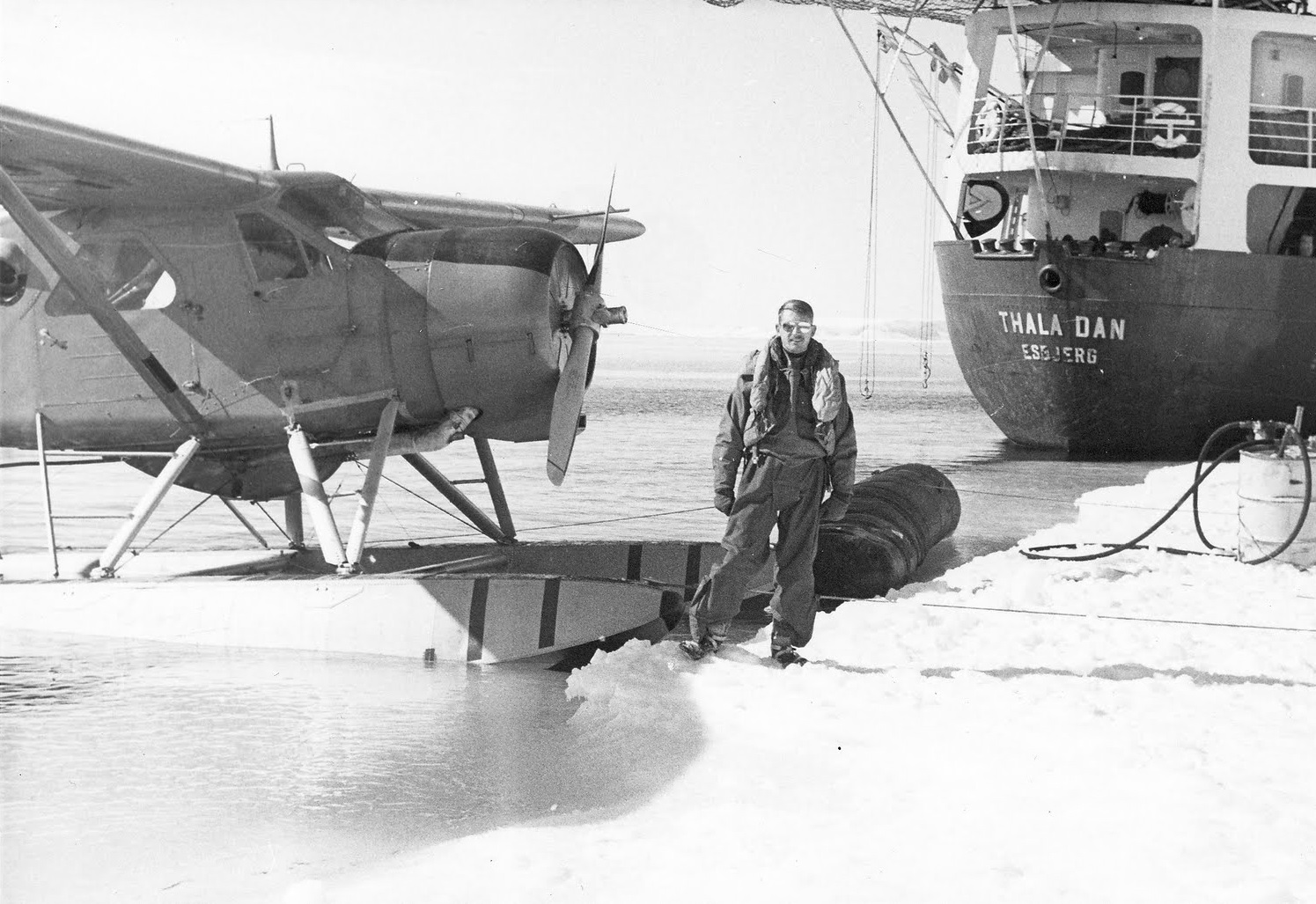
Pilot Officer Cooper tending to his RAAF DHC-2 Beaver float plane in Antarctica.

During Cooper's long aviation career, he had several close calls flying both military and commercial aircraft.

=== Loss of engine, Antarctica ===
On the afternoon of 19 January 1963, Pilot Officer Cooper was assigned to take two glaciologists and a doctor on a low level reconnaissance mission to survey the Vanderford Glacier in Antarctica. The aircraft was a Beaver DHC-2 float plane assigned to the RAAF's Antarctic Flight. Today, the Vanderford Glacier is located approximately 30 km southwest of Casey Station (which replaced Wilkes Station in 1969). During this mission, the engine de-icing system on the carburettor was unable to clear the build-up of ice. This resulted in a total engine failure. Cooper was able to glide the float plane down off the glacier and conducted a successful forced landing in the ocean just off the coastline. The team was able to paddle the Beaver back to shore where they set up a survival camp and awaited their rescue. A distress message was received and two Bell helicopters were dispatched for the initial search and rescue. The team was located after several hours and the main ship, the Thala Dan, arrived two hours later. The Thala Dan picked up the Beaver and a new carburettor was fitted to the aircraft the following day.

=== Engine fire indication, Malaysia ===
On 10 April 1964, Flying Officer Cooper was assigned to fly a reconnaissance mission from RAAF Station Butterworth in Malaysia in a 77 Squadron CAC Sabre, aircraft serial number A94-980. During the mission, whilst flying at 5,000 ft altitude, Cooper experienced an engine fire warning light which remained steady ON, indicating a fire in the engine compartment. Cooper immediately closed the engine throttle for a precautionary engine shutdown and the fire warning light went out a few moments later. This gave good cause to assume the engine fire was real, and thus, an engine relight was not attempted. Now gliding without an engine, Butterworth was too far away, so Cooper elected to conduct a forced landing at the 5,700 ft long Bayan Lapas airfield on the south side of Penang Island (today Penang International Airport). The engine-out glide landing was successful. During a technical inspection of the aircraft, a small piece of loose lock-wire was found behind the cockpit instrument panel. During some aircraft manoeuvres, this piece of loose wire landed on the fire warning light electrical terminals and closed the warning light circuit which caused a spurious engine fire light indication. The Air Force safety team commented how this small piece of foreign loose wire could have resulted in an unnecessary aircraft ejection, had Cooper been flying further out at sea. The safety team commended Cooper for his 'coolness in an emergency' and for his 'high degree of skill and judgement displayed in safely landing his flamed-out aircraft'.

=== Bird strike and engine loss, Australia ===
On 30 May 1966, Flight Lieutenant Cooper took off from RAAF Base Williamtown in New South Wales as the number two wingman in a formation of two Mirage fighter jets from 75 Squadron, led by the Commanding Officer, Wing Commander James 'Jim' Flemming. The departure was on runway 30, heading towards Raymond Terrace. One minute after takeoff, during a left turn, Cooper lost engine power in his Mirage, serial number A3-29. He was climbing through 1,500 ft with approximately 380 knots of airspeed. Cooper identified an engine compressor stall and zoomed the aircraft to approximately 4,300 ft and 240 knots, at which time he transmitted a "Mayday" call over the radio. The engine compressor stall failed to clear, so Cooper shut the engine off and attempted an engine relight. During this relight, Cooper spotted the 5,000 ft long WW2 dirt airstrip at Tomago off the left side of the aircraft nose. Tomago airstrip was 11 km to the southwest of RAAF Base Williamtown. The engine relight was unsuccessful. Being well positioned for the forced landing, Cooper elected to continue and attempt a landing, rather than eject and have the pilotless fully-fuelled Mirage potentially land on one of the many farmhouses or towns close by. After starting the flareout from 240kts, Cooper touched down at 180 knots and deployed the aircraft brake parachute. He came to a stop with only 500 ft of runway remaining. The engine-out forced landing was successful and the new Mirage (only 5 months old) was undamaged. The Commanding Officer, who was leading the formation, turned back to witness Cooper conduct his forced landing on the airstrip. Flemming circled overhead Tomago and coordinated the emergency Search and Rescue helicopter which arrived only 5 minutes after Cooper landed. During a technical inspection of the aircraft, it was discovered that a large hawk bird had been ingested down the engine intake shortly after takeoff, which smothered the engine compressor intake causing it to fail. Today, the Tomago airstrip is no longer in existence, and only a small section remains here 32°49'01.6"S 151°42'57.7"E.

=== Fuel pump failure and engine loss, Australia. ===
On 13 July 1967, Flight Lieutenant Cooper was conducting an engineering Air Test on a Mirage IIIO whilst operating from RAAF Base Darwin with 76 Squadron. Whilst at 25,000 ft and positioned 10 nautical miles north of Darwin, the low-pressure fuel cock switch malfunctioned, causing the engine to flameout. Cooper attempted to relight the engine, but due to the prevailing mechanical malfunction, the engine would not restart. Being well positioned close to Darwin, a successful engine-out glide landing was performed at RAAF Base Darwin onto runway 29.

=== Aircraft severely damaged by ground fire, Vietnam War ===
On 10 May 1968, Cooper was scrambled in his FAC role to coordinate air support for two beleaguered companies of Mechanized Infantry from the US Army's 5/60th Regiment, 3rd Brigade, 9th Infantry Division, during the Battle of South Saigon. The battle occurred 5 km south of Saigon on Highway 5A, 1 km north of Xom Tan Liem. This battle was part of the overall May Offensive, or Mini-Tet in Saigon. The 150-200 soldiers from Alpha and Charlie companies of the 5/60th were caught in a well-executed ambush and were overwhelmed by the enemy's firepower. Cooper, flying at tree-top level, flew over the enemy to draw their 12.7mm anti-aircraft fire and 7.62mm small arms fire onto his own aircraft so he could locate the exact enemy positions for the impending airstrikes. This was critical as the enemy were within 100m of the friendly locations. When the fighter jets arrived, Cooper again had to fly extremely low over the target area to mark the "Danger Close" targets using his rockets and smoke grenades, hand-delivered out of the window of his O-1 Bird Dog aircraft. Seeing the dire situation of the ground forces below, in between waves of fighter jets arriving and departing, Cooper was observed flying at low level whilst simultaneously firing his personal AR-15 automatic weapon into the enemy positions through the small window of his aircraft. Soldiers of the 5/60th witnessed a repeated hail of heavy ground fire aimed at Cooper's aircraft. They witnessed streams of green tracer rounds passing by his O-1 Bird Dog, with some soldiers observing pieces of his aircraft being shot off and falling to the ground. During this mission, Cooper provided FAC support to the 5/60th for over two hours and exposed himself to this extreme anti-aircraft threat numerous times. Some of the soldiers from Charlie Company expected to see Cooper's aircraft fall from the air at any time. The intense anti-aircraft fire resulted in Cooper's aircraft being severely damaged. Multiple bullet holes were discovered after he landed - but he stayed until the mission was completed and the soldiers' safety was assured. Cooper received a US Air Force Cross for these actions. His extraordinary heroism was instrumental in saving 150-200 US soldiers' lives and enabling the 5/60th to regroup and achieve their mission objective.

=== Crash landing, Vietnam War ===
On 18 August 1968 Cooper was scheduled to perform an Air Liaison Officer duty for the US Army's 2nd Brigade Commander of the 9th Infantry Division, Colonel Robert E. Archer. This involved flying in the Brigade Commander's 3-seat OH-23 Command and Control (C&C) helicopter to perform FAC duties as required. During an intense ground firefight that afternoon, the C&C helicopter was operating at low level above the combat area when it was struck by an accurate burst of small arms fire. One bullet grazed the back of the Brigade Commander's neck, one bullet hit the pilot in the head incapacitating him, and another bullet hit Cooper's flying helmet. The bullet penetrated Cooper's helmet just above his left ear. The bullet then travelled on the inside of his helmet, missing his head by only 2 cm, then exited his helmet above his forehead and finally penetrated the visor cover on his helmet. A photo of Cooper's bullet-damaged helmet is attached to this page. Whilst further injured during the helicopter crash, Cooper and Colonel Archer managed to survive this ordeal. For actions associated with this incident, Cooper received another US Air Force Cross.

=== Three engines lost, 116 passengers saved, Bahrain ===
In 1980, Cooper was the Captain of a Boeing 707 airliner, which was contracted to fly passenger routes with Alia airlines (today named Royal Jordanian airlines). The Boeing 707 is a large 4-engine commercial airliner, with engines #1 and #2 on the left wing, and engines #3 and #4 on the right wing. As the aircraft departed Dhahran in Saudi Arabia at night (runway 34 right), destined for Ras Al-Khaimah in the UAE, the engine fire light on number 4 engine illuminated. Cooper and the Flight Engineer (FE) confirmed it was #4 engine, but the FE inadvertently shut down #3 engine. Cooper called for engine #3 to be restarted and #4 to be secured. Cooper then called for max power and the FE pushed all 4 thrust levers to their max position. This created a significant yaw making it challenging for Cooper to maintain aircraft control. This excessive yaw created a notable disturbance to the airflow into engines #1 and #2. #2 engine experienced a significant engine surge and resultant pop-stall. This 'pop', caused by air rapidly blowing out the front of the engine, was severe. It resulted in blowing one of the engine 'blow in doors' off the front of the engine nacelle on #2, which was then ingested by #1 engine. #1 engine then experienced an immediate engine fire light. At this point, #1 and #4 engines both had active fire warning lights. Engine #2 was still experiencing a compressor stall, providing little to no thrust, and #3 (the only good engine) was still turned off and had not been restarted by the FE. Cooper declared an emergency to Bahrain Air Traffic Control and requested an immediate landing on runway 12 left. Fortunately, the available thrust was sufficient for the aircraft descent and landing. Upon landing, the normal brake and nose wheel steering systems were both inoperative. All of the main wheel tyres blew trying to bring the aircraft to a stop. Miraculously, the aircraft was saved, and all 116 passengers and crew were saved. This whole ordeal from takeoff to landing only took approximately 7 minutes. The King of Jordan, King Hussein bin Talal, gave his personal thanks to Cooper for saving the passengers and crew in what could have easily ended in a tragic accident.
