= Apollo Miguel Rezk =

Brazilian soldier (1918–1999)

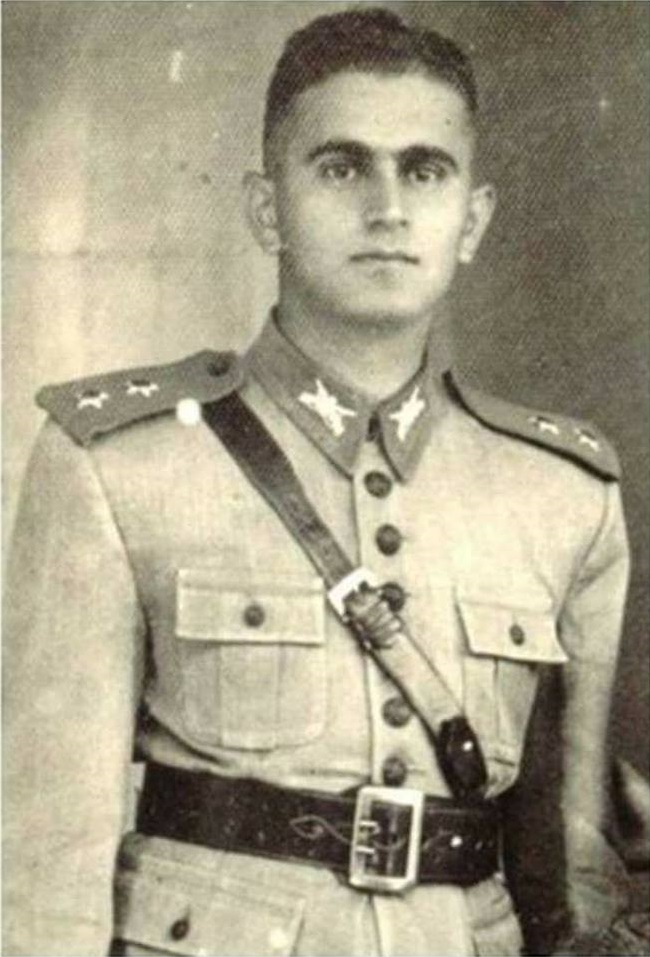
- The then 1st lieutenant Rezk in his Army uniform.
- Born: February 9, 1918; Rio de Janeiro, FD, Brazil
- Died: January 21, 1999 (aged 80); Rio de Janeiro, Brazil
- Education: Reserve Officer Training Center (CPOR/RJ)
- Spouse: Ivette Antunes Rezk
- Children: Nelson; Nádia
- Relatives: Suraya Mussalli Rezk (mother); Miguel Jorge Rezk (father)
- Military career
- Allegiance: Brazil
- Branch: Brazilian Army
- Service years: 1939–1957
- Rank: Major
- Unit: Brazilian Expeditionary Force: 1st Infantry Regiment Sampaio
- Commands: Platoon, 6th Company
- Known for: receiving the Distinguished Service Cross (DSC)
- Conflicts: World War II; Italian campaign; Operation Encore; Battle of Monte Castello; Battle of La Serra
- Awards: Distinguished Service Cross; Silver Star; Combat Cross

Apollo Miguel Rezk (9 February 1918 – 21 January 1999) was a reserve combat officer in the Brazilian Army who belonged to the Brazilian Expeditionary Force (FEB), the Brazilian military contingent sent to Europe in World War II. He went into combat during the Italian campaign, distinguishing himself in the battles of Monte Castello and La Serra. For his bravery and outstanding performance on the battlefields of Italy, he received numerous decorations from Brazil, as well as from the United States; including the Distinguished Service Cross (DSC), the second-highest decoration in the U.S. Army.

Upon his death, the United States government sent a representative to his funeral, while neither the Brazilian Army nor the Brazilian government sent any delegation.

== Early life ==
Apollo Miguel Rezk was the son of Miguel Jorge Rezk, a doctor, dentist, and pharmacist, and Suraya Mussalli Rezk, both immigrants from Lebanon and Syria, respectively.

He studied at Colégio Pedro II, where he graduated in 1935. His ideal was a military career, but the dream was thwarted when he failed the health exam for the Military School of Realengo. He then enrolled in the Higher School of Commerce, where he trained as an expert accountant. Later, he completed a degree in Economics. In 1939, he was declared an officer candidate (Brazilian Portuguese: Aspirante-a-oficial) in the Infantry branch by the Reserve Officer Training Center in Rio de Janeiro (Brazilian Portuguese: Centro de Preparação de Oficiais da Reserva, CPOR/RJ). With Brazil's entry into World War II, Lieutenant Apollo was called up for active service, embarking for Italy and joining the 1st Infantry Regiment "Sampaio", in the 2nd Echelon of the Brazilian Expeditionary Force (Brazilian Portuguese: Força Expedicionária Brasileira, FEB), now as a 1st Lieutenant.

== Monte Castelo and La Serra ==
On December 12, 1944, at Monte Castello, commanding his platoon, Lieutenant Apollo captured an important German position after a violent battle. For the bravery shown in this action, he was awarded the Silver Star medal by the US high command. However, he would demonstrate his courage, determination, and selflessness once again in La Serra when, on February 24, 1945, at the head of his platoon, crossing an extensive minefield and attacking the enemy's fortified positions. Despite facing heavy enemy resistance, the point was taken and held.

Though wounded , he managed to withstand the German counterattacksrepel them and even inflict severe casualties. At the field hospital, he heard the news on BBC Radio, from London, praising his bravery and leadership.

Apollo Rezk was decorated with the Campaign Medal, the Combat Cross 1st Class, the Blood Medal of Brazil, and the War Medal from the Brazilian Government. In recognition of his outstanding performance in the Battle of La Serra, he received the Distinguished Service Cross (DSC) from the hands of General Lucian Truscott. He remains a hero of the reserve officers and the most decorated soldier of FEB, being one of the few combatants worldwide to be distinguished with such an important award.

== Legacy ==
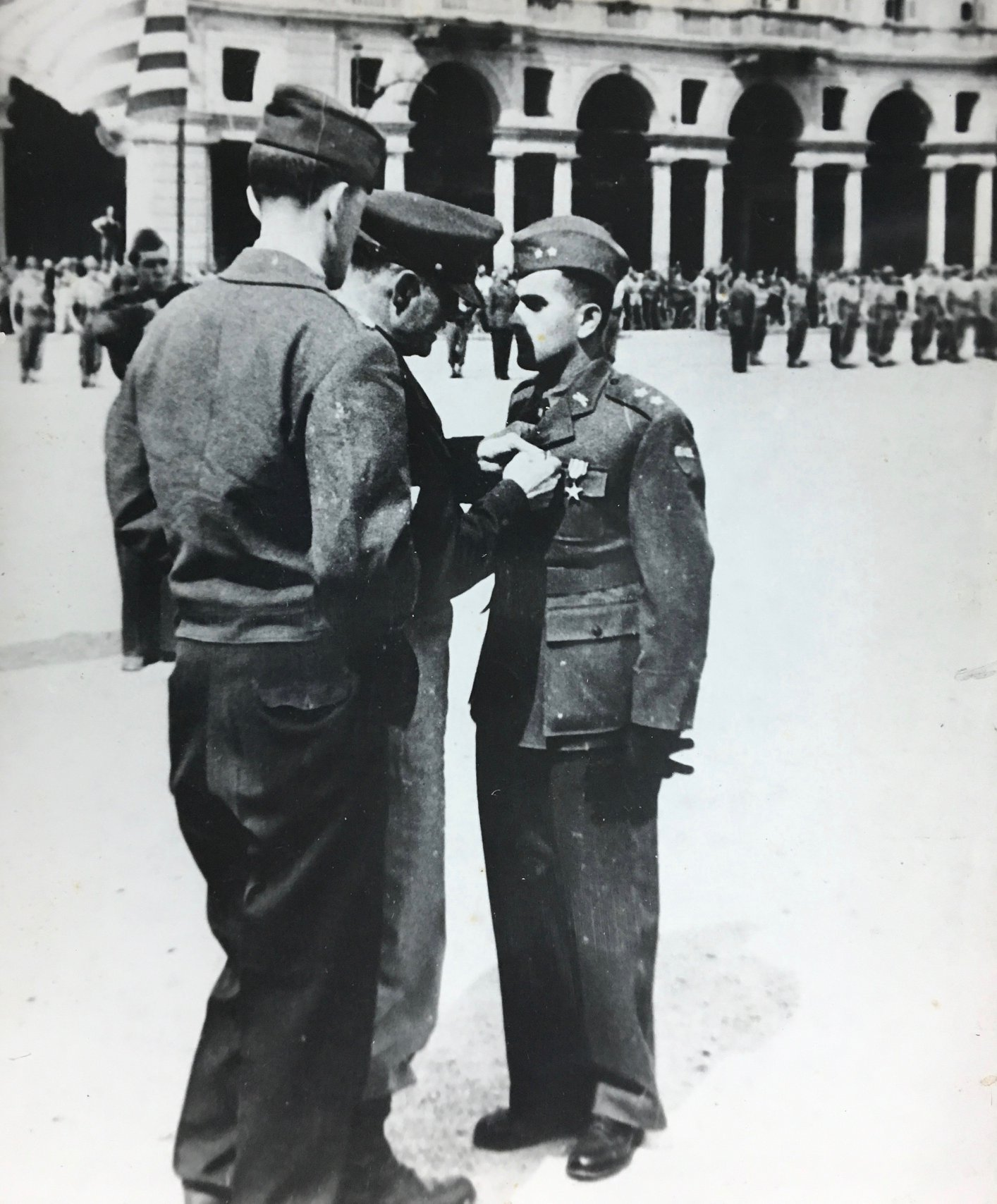
General Lucian Truscott, commander of the Fifth Army, accompanied by Major Vernon Walters, liaison officer with the FEB, awards First Lieutenant Apollo Miguel Rezk with the Distinguished Service Cross for his act of bravery during the capture of La Serra. The ceremony took place at 4:00 PM in Garibaldi Square in Alessandria, on May 19, 1945.

After the war ended, he continued his military career, being promoted to captain on September 3, 1951. He married Ivette Antunes Rezk, with whom he had two children: Nelson and Nádia. In addition to the Sampaio Regiment, he served in the Guards Battalion, when, on the occasion of the inauguration of the Caxias Pantheon in 1949, he presented the Guard of the then Ministry of War to the President of the Republic, General Eurico Gaspar Dutra. He also served in Curitiba as aide-de-camp to General Mário Perdigão. In 1957, he retired with the rank of major.

To this day, he was the only Brazilian military officer to receive the Distinguished Service Cross from the United States government, the highest military decoration before the Medal of Honor. With the exception of the Combat Cross, 2nd Class, he received all the decorations awarded to members of the Brazilian Expeditionary Force (FEB). The United States government sent a representative (a Navy officer) to his funeral in 1999, while he Brazilian government did not send representatives to his funeral.

In 1999, the year of his death, the National Council of Reserve Officers established the "Major Apollo Miguel Rezk" Medal (Brazilian Portuguese: Medalha “Major Apollo Miguel Rezk”) to honor military personnel and civilians who have distinguished themselves in actions supporting reserve officers. At the same time, the Major Apollo Miguel Rezk Special Chair was created at the Brazilian Academy of Military History (Brazilian Portuguese: Academia de História Militar Terrestre do Brasil, AHMTB), whose first occupant was his biographer, also a reserve officer, Sérgio Pinto Monteiro.

== Awards ==
=== Brazilian awards ===
Ribbon	Name	In Portuguese
	Combat Cross, 1st class	Cruz de Combate, 1ª classe
	Brazil Blood Medal	Medalha Sangue do Brasil
	Campaign Medal	Medalha de Campanha
	War Medal	Medalha de Guerra

=== Foreign awards ===
Ribbon	Name	Country
	Distinguished Service Cross	United States
	Silver Star	United States

== Bibliography ==
- Monteiro, Sérgio P.; Frizanco, Orlando (2006). O Resgate do Tenente Apollo [The Rescue of Lieutenant Apollo] (in Brazilian Portuguese). Rio de Janeiro: Conselho Nacional de Oficiais da Reserva (CNOR). p. 178. ISBN 978-8560227006. OCLC 694509697.
- Mergulhão, Luiz (2014). Major Apollo, o herói esquecido [Major Apollo, the forgotten hero] (in Brazilian Portuguese). Rio de Janeiro: Clube de Autores. p. 242. ISBN 978-8591676668.
