= Father and Scout =

- Film Poster
- Genre: Comedy; Family; Sport
- Written by: Sheldon Bull; Hoyt Hilsman
- Directed by: Richard Michaels
- Starring: Bob Saget; Brian Bonsall; Heidi Swedberg; Stuart Pankin; David Graf; Troy Evans
- Music by: David Kitay
- Country of origin: United States
- Original language: English

Production
- Executive producers: Sasha Emerson; Laura Gerson; Melissa Goddard; Peter Morgan; Bob Saget
- Producer: Cindy Lovelady (as Cindy Hornickel)
- Cinematography: Isidore Mankofsky
- Editors: Casey Brown; Michael Brown
- Running time: 95 minutes
- Production company: New Line Television

Original release
- Network: ABC
- Release: October 15, 1994

Father and Scout is a 1994 American comedy film, starring Bob Saget and Brian Bonsall. The film was written by Sheldon Bull and Hoyt Hilsman and directed by Richard Michaels. The film premiered on ABC on October 15, 1994.

== Plot ==
Spencer Paley is a writer from Los Angeles married to Donna and has a ten-year-old son Michael in sixth grade. During dinner, Donna reminds Michael to show Spencer a letter he received from his school. The letter is an invitation for a "dad and lad" weekend, a camping trip at a camp on Catalina Island. Spencer reluctantly agrees to attend, but reminds Donna that he is not the type for the outdoors or camping.

Spencer is introduced to the Scoutmaster who is the leader of the camping trip, and is also Michael's physical education teacher, and meets two fathers and their sons from Michael's class: film editor Aaron Deutch and his son Brent, and Chet Johansen, a firefighter and former United States Marine, and his son Chip.

At camp, Spencer and Aaron hit it off as neither of them want to hike and Spencer asks the Scoutmaster if they can take a water taxi to the camp. The Scoutmaster informs them that the water taxis are for the girls and their mothers of the sixth grade class who are going to another nearby camp on the same weekend. Spencer and Aaron disobey the Scoutmaster and board the water taxi with their sons.

After a series of activities, Spencer goes on the beach and tells Aaron he feels the camping trip was designed to prove to fathers how lousy of an example they are to their sons. In frustration he throws a stone into the water. However, the Scoutmaster gave specific instructions to the campers earlier to not throw stones in the water to prevent disrupting the beach. The Scoutmaster requests Spencer to retrieve the stone he threw in the water and return it to the beach or he will have Spencer and Michael escorted off the beach by the harbor patrol. Spencer attempts to honor his request sarcastically, but is stung in the foot by a jellyfish, forcing the beach to be evacuated.

Spencer and Michael return to their tent but find it has been trashed. Aaron tells him it could have either been a wild animal or hazing. Chet is accused of trashing the tent, leading to him being separated from Spencer. The Scoutmaster requests Spencer not return to the camping trip the following year as the camp cannot financially afford to pay for his injuries.

Spencer calls the water taxi that took him to the camp earlier honoring Michael's request but he realizes he has failed Michael as a father and has a responsibility to raise him to be a man. He then requests Michael to finish out the weekend with him and Michael eventually agrees. Spencer tells the water taxi navigator to go ahead without them, and Spencer agrees to participate in the treasure hunt with Michael.

Michael finds the path to the treasure and he and Spencer are the first to claim it. It turns out it is gold wrapped chocolate coins. Chet and Chip arrive to take the treasure away but Spencer insists they found it first. Chip attacks Michael and Chet engages Spencer in another fight. Spencer and Chet fall into a wooden hole above a cavern. Chet manages to escape and free Spencer, resulting in the two reconciling.

Upon returning home, Michael tells Donna about the events of the weekend, but she does not believe him. Michael is disappointed he cannot convince his mother but Spencer reminds him that they know what really happened and to be happy for what they accomplished. Michael is then sent to bed happy because of his weekend experience. Spencer thanks Donna for making him go on the trip, and tells her he wants to do scuba diving and bungee jumping but Donna tells him to not get overwhelmed with new ideas because he goes overboard with them.

== Cast ==
- Bob Saget as Spencer Paley
- Brian Bonsall as Michael Paley
- Heidi Swedberg as Donna Paley
- Stuart Pankin as Aaron Deutch
- David Graf as Chet Johansen
- Troy Evans as Scoutmaster
- Denver Pyle as George Rosebrock
- Brian Levinson as Brent
- Chachi Pittman as Chip Johansen
- Kimberly Scott as Francine
- Ryan Holihan as Nolan #1
- Lucy Butler as Married Woman
- Robert Egan as Nolan #2
- Hassan Nicholas as Camper
- Steven Kavne as Grandpa Paley
- John Petlock as Doctor

== Reception ==
TV Guide gave the film two out of five stars, concluding: "FATHER AND SCOUT is satisfactory family entertainment. The script has little to offer in the way of originality, but it is innocuous fun". The website Need Coffee gave the film a very bad review, stating: "If you have very small kids who don't know what a good movie is, they might like this. But why get them off on the wrong foot? Best to just turn and walk away."
