= Shilluk Kingdom =

c. 1490 – 1865 kingdom in East Africa

Shilluk (Chollo) Kingdom Läg Cøllø or "Pödh Cøllø" or "Sudan" in Arabic
- 1490–1861
- Flag

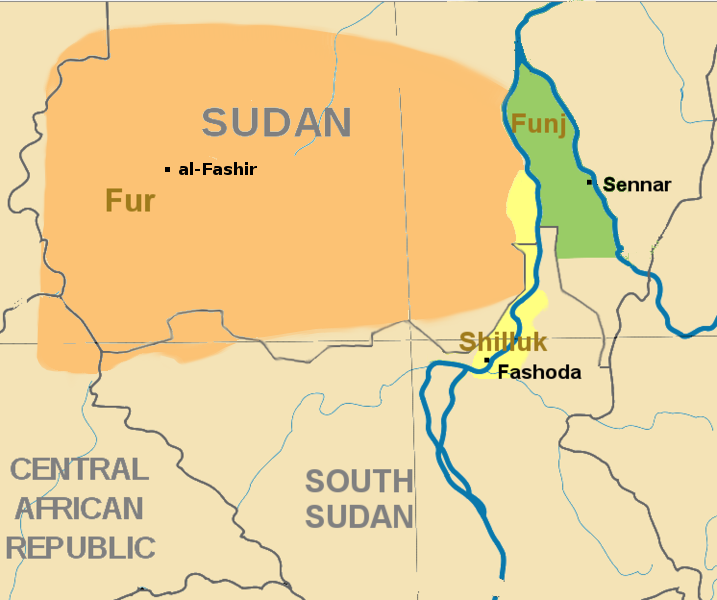
- Shilluk Kingdom (yellow) and its neighbors
- Status: State from 15th century-1861 Currently a non-sovereign monarchy within South Sudan
- Capital: Fashoda (from the late 17th century)
- Largest city: Fashoda
- Common languages: Shilluk
- Religion: Imperial cult African Traditional Religion
- Government: Divine monarchy
- Rädh
  - 1490–1517: Nyikaangø
  - 17th century: Odaagø Ocøllø
  - 17th century: Rädh Tugø
  - 1992-present: Kwongo Dak Padiet
- History
  - Established by Nyikang: 15th century 1490
  - Conquered by Turco-Egyptians: 1861
  - Disestablished: 1861

Population
  - (1900s): 200,000 (est)
Succeeded by
Ottoman Egypt; Anglo-Egyptian Sudan

The Shilluk Kingdom, dominated by the Shilluk people, was located along the left bank of the White Nile in what is now South Sudan and southern Sudan. Its capital and royal residence were in the town of Fashoda. According to Shilluk folk history and neighboring accounts, the kingdom was founded by Nyikang, who probably lived in the second half of the 15th century. A Nilotic people, the Shilluk managed to establish a centralized kingdom that reached its apogee in the late 18th and early 19th centuries, during the decline of the northern Funj Sultanate. In the 19th century, the Shilluk were affected by military assaults from the Ottoman Empire, resulting in the destruction of the kingdom in the early 1860s. The Shilluk king is currently not an independent political leader, but a traditional chieftain within the governments of South Sudan and Sudan. The current Shilluk king is Reth Kwongo Dak Padiet who ascended to the throne in 1993.

The monarchy (the Reth) has been political and religious in nature. The monarch guaranteed social order; his health and the health of the nation were intertwined. Worship is performed in rituals inspired by the national myth of Nyikang, the first Reth. The Shilluk monarchy and the beliefs of its people was studied in 1911 by Charles Seligman and in 1916 by British anthropologist James George Frazer in The Golden Bough. Seligman described the Shilluk form of government as a "sacred kingship".

== Geography and people ==
The kingdom was located along a strip of land along the western and eastern bank of the White Nile and Sobat River, from Lake No to about 12° north latitude. The Shilluk people are closely related to the more numerous South Sudanese ethnic groups, the Nuer and Dinka (their neighbors to the south and east, respectively). Their language is related to that of the Anuak people near the rivers Baro and Pibor.

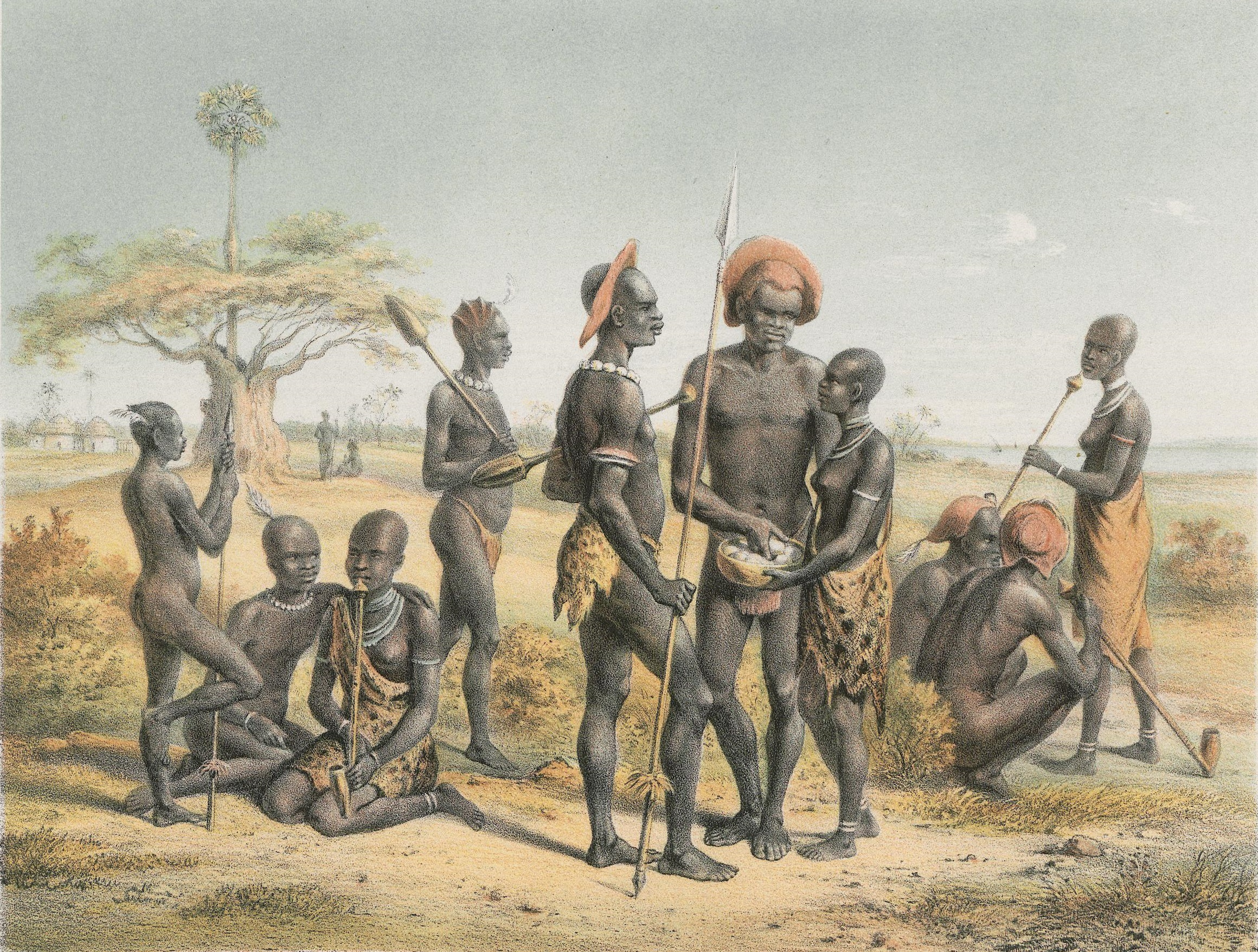
A group of Shilluk in around 1860, just before the fall of the kingdom. Men were either naked or wore the skins of cats or young lambs, while women and children wore calf skins.

The English name for the Shilluk language derives from the Arabic version of the Shilluk self-designation: Cøllø, or Chollo. This (and a belief by many Shilluk) suggests a common origin with the Acholi, another ethnic group living on the Ugandan-South Sudanese and Luo in Tanzania, Kenya, DRC, Chad, CAR and Ethiopia (Anuak) borders.

Like most Nilotic peoples of South Sudan (such as the Nuer and Dinka), the Shilluk practiced subsistence semi-nomadic cattle breeding and some grain farming. Their social system was egalitarian, and the cattle herds had great symbolic value. The lifestyle of the modern Shilluk is similar, except that their herds are smaller. The Shilluk were capable of being sedentary, because the land along the White Nile was more fertile than elsewhere in the region. Their cultivation of durra, a variety of sorghum, made them a relatively prosperous agricultural people except during prolonged droughts. In 2005 Shilluk population was estimated at 1.7 million; during the nineteenth century they were estimated at 200,000, living in hundreds of villages. The kingdom was divided into two provinces: Gher (Gärø) in the north and Luak (Lwagø) in the south. These, in turn, were divided into zones.

== History ==
=== Origins ===
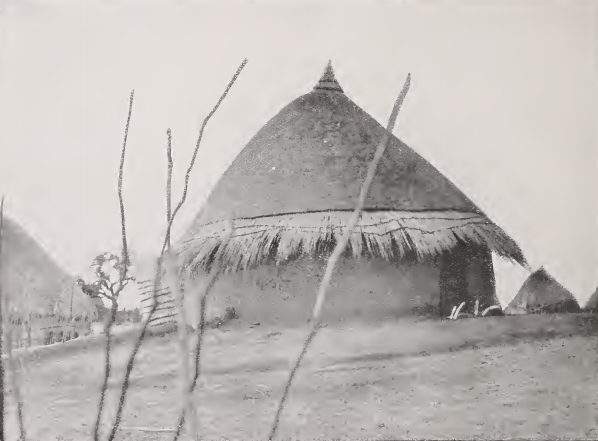
A shrine dedicated to Nyikang, early 20th century

According to Shilluk legends, the kingdom was founded in 1490. Its legendary first ruler ("Reth") was the hero known as Nyikang who claimed to be half-crocodile and possessed power over the rain. Nyikang was the son of a king, Okwa, who ruled a country located "far south near a large lake". This may be Lake Albert, where the Acholi live. After Okwa's death, Nyikang went to war with his brother Duwadh, the legitimate successor to the throne. Facing defeat, Nyikang left his homeland with his retinue and migrated northeast to Wau (near the Bahr el Ghazal, "river of gazelles" in Arabic). Here (known by the Shilluk as the Pothe Thuro) Nyikang married the daughter of Dimo, the local magician. After a conflict with Dimo Nyikang migrated north (crossing the Bahr el Ghazal) to Acietagwok (a Shilluk village about 30 kilometres (19 mi) west of the village of Tonga) around 1550. Nyikang then traveled to Nyilual, an uninhabited region west of the present town of Malakal. In the end, legends claim that Nyikang vanished in a whirlwind in the middle of a battle.

== Kingdom ==
=== Border conflicts ===
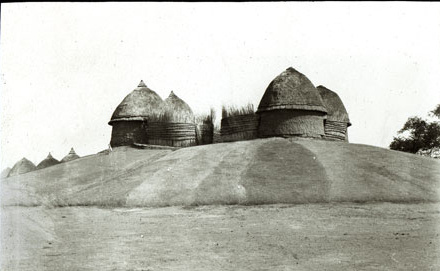
Aturwik, the homestead mound of the Shilluk king at Fashoda with his four huts built on top. Photo by Charles Gabriel Seligman

During the 17th century, to ensure a surplus of resources the Shilluk raided and looted neighbouring populations north and south along the White Nile. The looting was usually conducted by the heads of podh (clusters of villages). The Reth was no exception; the Reth of the south would send his Shilluk warriors upstream to Dinka lands. Reserving the largest share of the plunder, the Reth increased his possessions and his influence on the Shilluk country through his armed men, Bath Reth. The timing of these events remains obscure, and it is unclear whether the Reth is a figure from a single dynasty or several Reth coexisted. If the latter, there may have been a dozen different dynasties.

Between the reign of King Odak Ochollo (c. 1600–1635) and 1861, the Shilluk tried to expand their northern border militarily. The portion of the valley of the White Nile between the villages of Muomo and Asalaya was unfavourable for agriculture; however, the northern savannah provided an abundance of game, fish and honey. To control trade on the White Nile Odak Ochollo made an alliance with the Sultanate of Darfur, supporting it in its fight against the ethnic Funj of the Sennar Sultanate.

By 1630, the Dinka south and west of the Shilluk country had invaded the southern border of the Sultanate of Sennar. The progression of the Dinka continued through the 17th and 18th centuries, towards the Gezira region. Before this changed the strategic balance, the Shilluk and Funj united against the Dinka and checked them militarily. This era marked the beginning of Shilluk economic ties to other groups (Funj, Arabs, European merchants and Mahdists).

=== Golden Age ===
After 1650 the Shilluk population (despite its diversity) appeared to gain a sense of national unity, accompanied by a strengthening of royal authority. The Reth and a more-centralized government established a monopoly on economic resources and trade. This consolidation is primarily due to the military success of the Shilluk King Dhokoth (c. 1670–1690). Looting continued upstream along the White Nile in Dinka territory and westward to the Nuba Mountains.

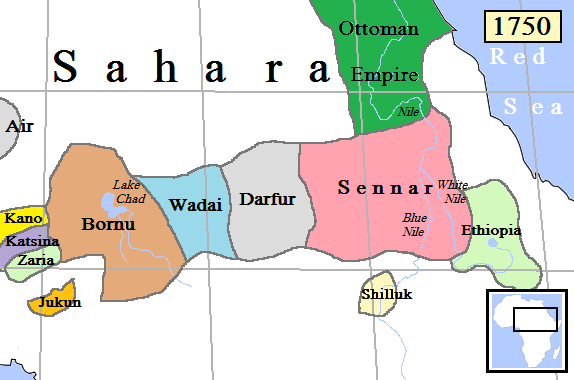
The state along the Sahel in 1750

In 1684, a drought destroyed the Shilluk crops. Driven by hunger, many men took up arms and went down the river to the Arabized peoples of present Sudan. These lootings were orchestrated from the river; men in canoes would raid the northern Arab regions. During this time the White Nile was known as the Bahr al-Scheluk, the "river of Shilluk". King Tugø (Rädh Tugø) (c. 1690–1710), son of Rädh Dhøköödhø, founded Fashoda as the permanent residence of the Shilluk kings and set up elaborate rituals and investiture ceremonies.

The Shilluk Kingdom reached its peak in the 18th century, as the Sultanate of Sennar declined in power. The Shilluk kings took the disappearance of Sennar from the political scene as an opportunity to strengthen their position on the northern frontier. The caravans were under the influence of the Shilluk kings, and were enriched by the shuttle service made available by the Shilluk to merchants wishing to cross the White Nile to Asalaya when travelling between Sennar and El Obeid. The Shilluk Kingdom expanded its territory up to the confluence of the Blue and White Nile, where Khartoum was later built, and defeated numerous attempted invasions by the northern peoples.

=== Decline and restoration ===
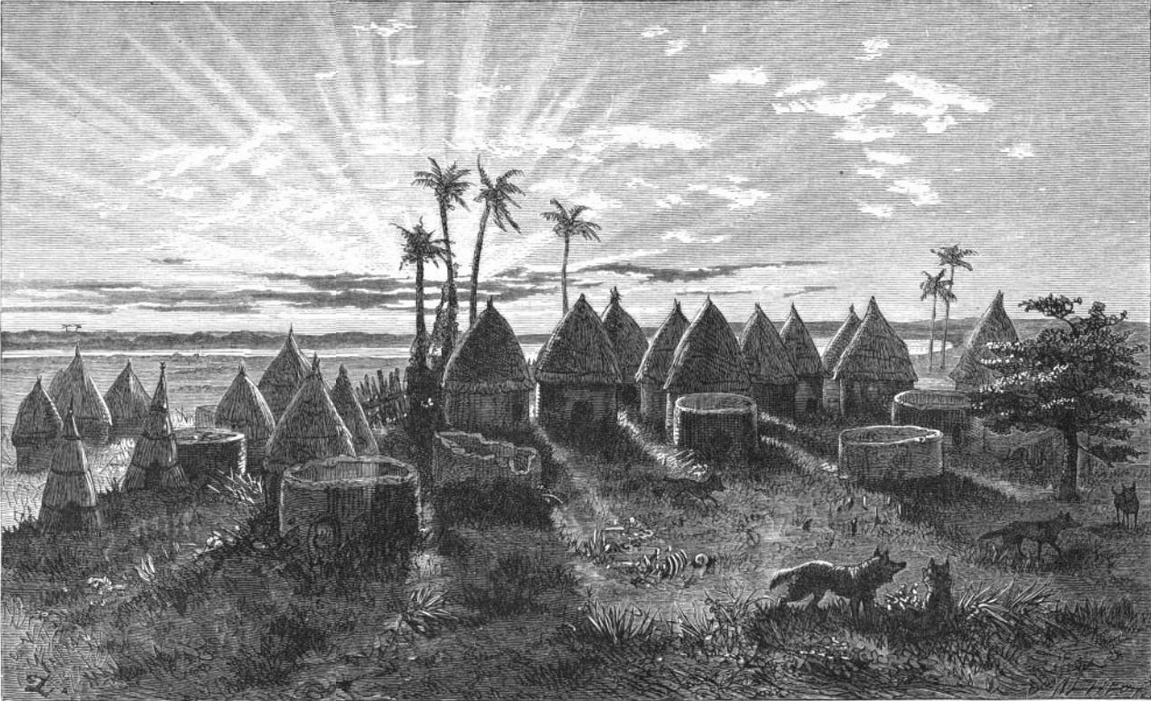
A deserted Shilluk village after a Turkish slave raid, 1862

In 1786, the Funj Sultanate of Sennar began a period of decline. Sultan Adlan II was troubled by his war with the Hameg tribe established south of the town of Er Roseires, following 30 years of anarchy and looting by Sheikh Nasser Hameg. In 1820 the Viceroy of Egypt, Muhammad Ali, began his southern campaign to conquer the Sudan. That year, the Turkish-Egyptian troops of Ismail Pasha also put a final end to the Sultanate of Funj. Confrontation between the Ottomans and Shilluk became inevitable.

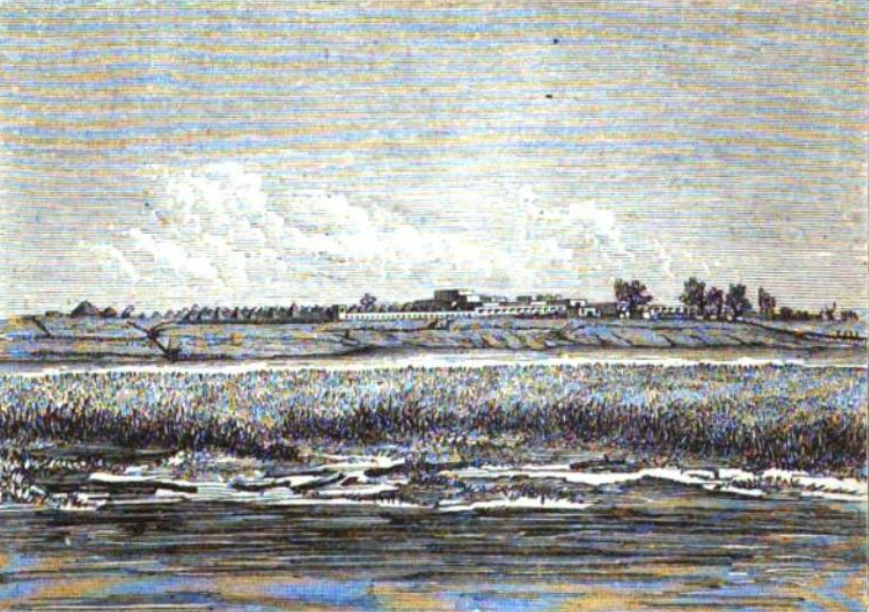
Fashoda in 1869, when it had become the seat of an Egyptian governor

Beginning in 1821, despite resistance from the Shilluk, the northern border began to recede. The first confirmed slave raid by northerners into Shilluk land occurred in 1826. From then on, the kingdom was increasingly targeted by raiders. During the reign of Reth Nyokwejø (Yör, Nyokwejø wäd Kwondïd (Nyikwëyø) kwar Okonø wäd Tugø) (c. 1780–1820) a united force of Dinka and Nuer crossed the river Sobat, which cost the Shilluk total control of the White Nile. By 1865, the Shilluk Kingdom had lost part its political standing.

The present Shilluk (Chollo) Kingdom is known by Sudanese as Pödh Cøllø (Sudan) after the independence of the Republic of Sudan. The lands of what was the Shilluk Kingdom are now part of South Sudan and the current Shilluk King is Reth Kwongo Dak Padiet who succeeded to Rethship in 1993 after the death of the previous King Reth Ayang Aney Kur in 1992.

== Culture ==
=== Social structure ===
==== Lineage (Kwa) ====
The word Kwa means "grandfather" or "ancestor". Kwaarø and Kwari have similar meanings, but imply descent: "grandchild" and "down". They are the Shilluk equivalents of "lineage" and "clan". The members of a Kwa descend from the same ancestor, the Kwar Kwa; Kwar Okëëlø means all the descendants of Okëëlø (the name of a person). This system is also used with legendary characters. More than 100 lineages have been studied.

Examples of Kwa are:

- The Kwa Ajalø was founded by Jalø, an exile with Nyikaangø (Nyikang).
- The Kwa Mønø was founded by Mønø, a servant Nyikaaŋø met when he arrived in the Shilluk country.
- The Kwa Ju was founded by Ju, half-brother of Nyikaangø.
- The Kwa Tugi was founded by Tugø, a spirit which Nyikaangø found in a river.
- The Kwa Tuga was founded by Tuga, an Arab whose sister married Nyikaangø.

==== Group (Pödhø) ====
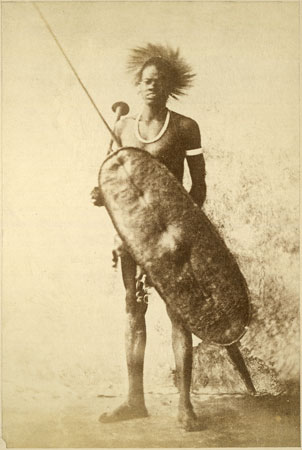
Late 19th-century Shilluk warrior

The pödhø, or grouping, may refer to any grouped set, the Shilluk country, a group or a federation. In the latter context, pödhø refers to a group of villages inhabited by several lineages which unite for mutual defense under a single leader. This federation of hamlets is the basis of Shilluk social structure. The region has over 100 pödhø.

Before and during the British colonization, these lineages united against the threat of tribal wars. However, during peacetime the communities dissolved because of internal strife; many people faced a conflict of allegiance between their podh leader and the leader of their Kwar.

Originally, Nyikang gave each lineage a podh as its home territory. If this line still exists, it is considered the owner of the land and its members are known as dyil. The other lines living in the area from later migrations are known as wëdhdh. If the ruling dyëll family dies out, the rights go to the second-oldest lineage in the area. The lineage of the dyëll theoretically provides the podh with its leader, but authority may revert to the most-important lineage. In this case, the original lineage retains its prestige and land-ownership rights. Some groups (such as the Odong Panyikang) have adopted a rotation system of authority between the two (or three) most-important lines.

==== Hamlet (Pajø) ====
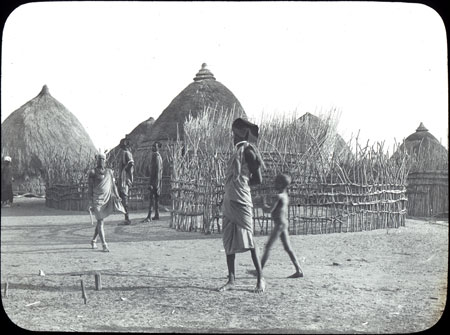
A Shilluk pajø

Within each group (podh) are hamlets (pajø). The pac is inhabited by individuals from the same lineage. Some hamlets may consist of only one dwelling, but others may have more than fifty. The pajø is a family in its broadest sense. A traditional dwelling consists of two huts (gol) separated by a small space enclosed by millet stalks or coarse grass mats. The homes are built around a large common pen for goats and cows. A large hut (lwagø) houses livestock during the rainy season. During the rest of the year, the hut is a hostel for foreign guests and a town hall.

==== Family (gølø, or "kalø" gool) ====
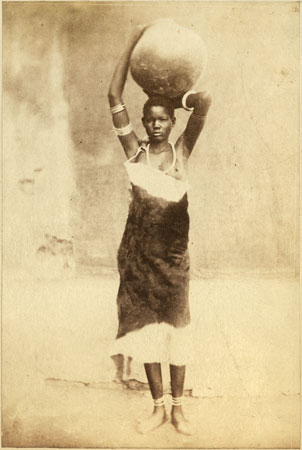
Shilluk woman carrying a jar

By extension, gol or "kalø" or ("home") also means "family". In the latter sense, the gol is the smallest unit of Shilluk society. An unmarried man does not have his own home; unmarried individuals are attached to their father's gol. If his father has died, the single person joins the gol of his oldest living married brother. The owner of the house is the head of his family, responsible for its inhabitants and the family herd. Since the traditional remedy for an offense is payment in cattle, the head of the family (not the wrongdoer) is responsible for the offense.

=== Classes ===
The Shilluk people were divided into four classes.

==== Kwareth ====
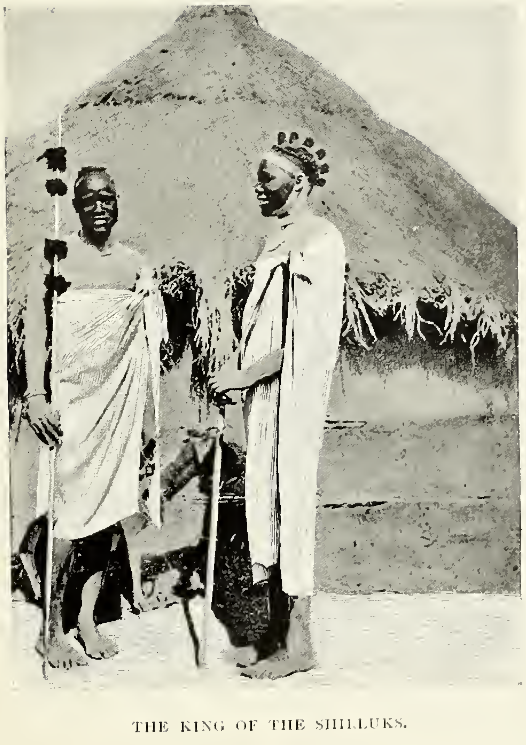
The Shilluk king in 1908

The Kwareth (kwa, "ancestor"; reth, "king") is the royal clan of descendants of Nyikang. This group is widely distributed, with its members having the greatest number of wives. Although it currently has no political authority, members of this class form a rural aristocracy. Members hold one of four titles:

- Reth: The regent, who succeeds through male primogeniture
- Nyireth: Prince or princess; if male, the heir presumptive
- Nyareth: son of a nyireth
- Kwar Nyireth: son of a lesser nyireth

==== Ororo (Ororø) ====
The Ororø is a branch of the royal line which has lost its place in the line of succession. Its members are similar to the rest of the population, except for their ritual functions in connection with royalty.

During the reign of King Odaagø, the Shilluk were defeated by the Dinka after a battle against the Anuaks. After this setback, it was decided at a council of war to enlist all princes in battle the next day. The conscripted army crossed the river to battle, except for Prince Duwadh (Dïwäädø wäd Ocøllø). The battle was a massacre, in which all the princes were killed. Duwadh became king, and demoted every son of the dead princes to the Cøllø class. Since then, only descendants of Duwadh were eligible for the Kwar Reth class. Those relegated were nicknamed Ororø ("son of a crowd of young girls").

==== Chollo (Cøllø) ====
This class includes most Shilluk clans and the majority of the Shilluk people. Its members are descendants of the collateral Nyikang (Jur clans, or dhø kalø), the descendants of Nyikang's companions in exile (Abögø clans, Mööyø or Kwa'julø), or Kwa'Jängø the offspring of other peoples who settled in Shilluk country (the Kwa'Jängø clan was originally a Dinka clan) and the descendants of the peoples who were settled in Shilluk country before Nyikang's arrival (the Oman clan). Were as Kwa'Mööyø are originally Nuer descendants in Shilluk (Chollo) Kingdom.

==== Bang Reth: Bangng Rädhø ====
The Bang Reth is the class owned by the king. It consists of two groups: the first group includes his royal wives and the widows of dead kings, and the second includes serfs (descendants of slaves captured in raids, or volunteers under the protection of the king because of a violent crime).

== Religion and mythology ==
=== Lineage of Nyikang ===
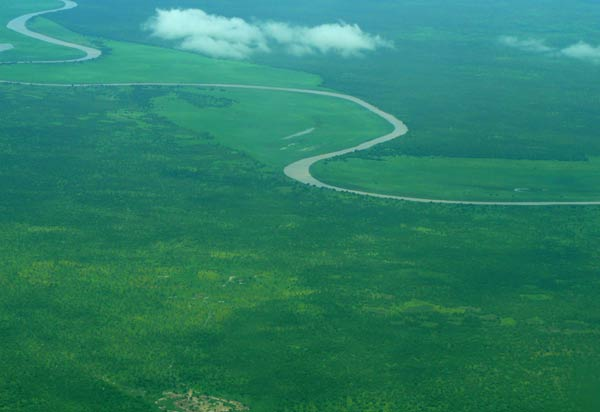
The river Sobat in South Sudan where the first King Nyikang founded the Shilluk Kingdom.

The Shilluk, like other Nilotic peoples, do not give great importance to cosmology. The Shilluk focus on a figure who lived so long ago his life is shrouded in myth: King Nyikang. His origins were considered divine. A white cow named Dean Aduk (Dhyang Adugø) bore a gourd. When it was torn, a man named Kolo (Köölø, Pöölø) arose. Kolo fathered Omaro (Omaarø), who fathered Wat Mol (Wäd Möölø), who fathered Okwä. (Note: DS Oyler's document states the cow that gave it birth Omaro (Omaarɔ) begat Kolo (Köölø, Pöölø) who begot Okwa Mol (Okwä Möölø) as opposed to Kolo being the founder.)

Okwa was said to have visited a riverbank and saw two beautiful young women, Nyakayo (Nyikaayø) and Ongwak, coming out of the water. They had long hair, and part of their bodies was crocodile-shaped. Okwa grabbed them, and took them by force; their screams alerted their father, Dunyel Ju'Okwa, who was nearby. Dunyel's was a man on his right side, but a crocodile on his left. After some discussion, Dunyel agreed to give his two daughters to Okwa (Okwä) at a high bride price. Nyakayo (Nyikaayø) Nyikang bore several children; Nyikang was considered by some his eldest son, but according to others he was his youngest son. Another tradition says that Nyikang's twin brother was Duwat (Dïwäädɔ). A popular belief connects the confluence of the River Sobat and the White Nile with Nyakayo's home.

=== Exile ===
The death of Okwa (Okwä) began a feud between Nyikang (Nyikaangø) and his brother Duwat (Dïwäädø) about monarchical succession. Duwat became king; Nyikang refused to swear allegiance, deciding to move elsewhere with his family. Names vary with versions of the myth, although Omoli Ju (Omööli Ju), Ju Nya Okwä is commonly named.

When Nyikang was leaving, Duwat asked him to look behind him as he threw a long, sharp stick towards his half-brother. With this gesture, Duwat signified that the migrants could never return. However, Nyikang took the stick and used it to plant crops.

After many days of travel, the migrant group arrived in a land ruled by Dim (Dïmø), a sorcerer. Nyikang married, and his wife bore him a son named Dak (Daagø). The fugitives settled near where the Sobat River flowed into the White Nile, and founded the Shilluk Kingdom.

== Notes and references ==
=== Bibliography ===
- Beswick, Stephanie (2014). "The Role of Slavery in the Rise and Fall of the Shilluk Kingdom". In Souad T. Ali; et al. (eds.). The Road to the Two Sudans. Cambridge Scholars. pp. 108–142. ISBN 9781443856324.
- Graeber, David (2011). "The Divine Kingship of the Shilluk". HAU: Journal of Ethnographic Theory. 1 (1). University of Chicago: 1–62. doi:10.14318/hau1.1.002. ISSN 2575-1433. S2CID 159850613.
- Martell, Peter (2018). First Raise a Flag. London: Hurst & Company. ISBN 978-1849049597.
- Mercer, Patricia (1971). "Shilluk Trade and Politics from the Mid-Seventeenth Century to 1861". The Journal of African History. 12 (3). Cambridge University: 407–426. doi:10.1017/s0021853700010859. S2CID 154445649.
- Ogot, Bethwell Allan (1998). Histoire générale de l'Afrique: V. L'Afrique du XVIe au XVIIIe siècle (in French). UNESCO. ISBN 9789232024978.
- Oyler, D. S. (1918). "Nikawng and the Shilluk migration". Sudan Notes and Records. Vol. I.
- Pumphrey, M. E. C. (1941). "The Shilluk tribe". Sudan Notes and Records. Vol. XXIV, part I.
- Westermann, Diedrich (1912). The Shilluk People, Their Language and Folklore.
