= List of demigods =

This is a list of notable offspring of a deity with a mortal, in mythology and modern fiction. Such entities are sometimes referred to as demigods, although the term "demigod" can also refer to a minor deity, or great mortal hero with god-like valour and skills, who sometimes attains divine status after death.

== Greek mythology ==
- Achilles: son of the sea nymph Thetis (daughter of sea god Nereus), and Peleus, king of the Myrmidons.
- Actaeon: son of Aristaeus and Autonoë, Boeotian prince who was turned into a stag by Artemis and torn to pieces by his own hounds.
- Aeacus: son of Zeus and Aegina who was the daughter of a river god. He was the father of Telamon and Peleus and grandfather of Ajax and Achilles.
- Aeëtes: son of Helios. He was the king of Colchis and played a key role in the story of the Argonauts. His daughter Medea married the famous hero Jason.
- Aeneas: Trojan hero, son of Aphrodite, goddess of love and Prince Anchises. He fled to Italy and became the ancestor of Romulus and Remus, founders of Rome.
- Amphion: son of Zeus and Antiope, and twin brother of Zethus.
- Arcas: son of Zeus and Callisto, formerly a nymph and huntress associated with Artemis.
- Aristaeus: son of Apollo and Cyrene, a Thessalian princess. He was a shepherd who was made a god after inventing skills such as cheese-making and bee-keeping.
- Asclepius: son of Apollo and Coronis, who achieved divine status after death. He became such a great healer, that he could bring back the dead. Zeus killed him for this, but raised him from the dead as the god of healing and medicine.
- Augeas: son of Helios, king of Elis. Heracles had to clean his stables as one of his famed twelve labours.
- Autolycus: son of Hermes. He was a famous thief and ancestor of Odysseus who was also Heracles' wrestling teacher.
- Bellerophon: according to Homer's Iliad, son of Glaucus and Eurymede of Corinth. According to Apollodorus and Hesiod's catalogues by Hyginus, he was a son of the sea god Poseidon by Eurymede.
- Calais: son of Boreas (the Greek god of the cold north wind and the bringer of winter) and Oreithyia, daughter of King Erechtheus of Athens. His brother was Zethes, and they are collectively known as Boreads.
- Ceyx: son of Eosphorus, King of Trachis and husband of Alcyone.
- Codrus: son of Poseidon and King of Athens, forefather of Ariston of Athens, father of Plato
- Cycnus: son of Poseidon. Killed by Achilles during the Trojan War.
- Dardanus: son of Zeus and Electra, daughter of Atlas.
- Deucalion: son of Prometheus. He and his cousin-wife Pyrrha repopulated the earth after the Great Flood that ended the Bronze Age.
- Dionysus: son of Zeus and Semele, born a mortal, later became the god of wine. Also called Bacchus by the Romans.
- Epaphus: son of Zeus and Io, a priestess of the goddess Hera (Zeus' wife).
- Harmonia: according to Greek mythology was the daughter of Ares and Aphrodite. However, in Samothrace mythology, she was the daughter of Zeus and Electra.
- Heracles: son of Zeus (king of the gods) and Alcmene, a mortal woman.
- Helen: According to older sources, daughter of king Tyndareus and Leda, but Homer also calls her daughter of Zeus and Leda. Wife of Menelaus, the king of Sparta.
- Hippolyta: daughter of Ares, a Queen of the Amazons.
- Hyacinthus: son of the Muse Clio and Oebalus of Sparta, lover of Apollo.
- Iasion: son of Zeus and Electra (one of the seven daughters of Atlas and Pleione). He was the brother of Dardanus.
- Ion: son of Apollo and Creusa of Athens. Creusa abandoned Ion when he was just a child, so he was raised by a priestess of Delphi. They eventually reunited many years later.
- Memnon: son of Tithonus and Eos, a Titan goddess of the dawn.
- Minos: son of Zeus and Europa, and king of Crete. He commissioned Daedalus to build him the Labyrinth, where he hid the Minotaur, a bull-man creature born from the union of his wife Pasiphae and a bull.
- Narcissus: son of the river-god Cephissus and Liriope. A Boeotian hero who scorned many of his lovers, including Echo. Cursed by Nemesis, he ended up falling in love with his own reflection.
- Neleus: son of Poseidon and Tyro and king of Pylos. He was the twin brother of Pelias, who played a key role in the story of the Argonauts. He and most of his sons were killed by Heracles, leaving only one survivor.
- Orion: son of Poseidon (the sea god) and Euryale, a Cretan princess. Along with Hippolytus, he is one of the only male hunters who followed Artemis.
- Orpheus: son of Calliope and the god Apollo.
- Pasiphae: daughter of Helios. She was a powerful sorceress who married King Minos of Crete. Due to a curse from Aphrodite, she fell in love with the Cretan Bull. Her union with the bull produced the Minotaur.
- Pelias: son of Poseidon and Tyro and king of Iolcus. He was the twin brother of Neleus, and played a key role in the story of the Argonauts. He challenged his nephew Jason to sail to Colchis and bring back the legendary Golden Fleece. His daughters were tricked into killing him by Jason's wife Medea.
- Penthesilea: daughter of Ares and Otrera, a Queen of the Amazons.
- Perseus: son of Zeus and mortal princess Danae, whom he impregnated as a golden shower.
- Phaethon: son of Helios and Clymene, famous for crashing the sun chariot.
- Polydeuces, also known by his Roman name of Pollux: one of the Dioscuri and twin brother of Castor. He was son of Zeus and the mortal Leda while his twin had a mortal father, king Tyndareus (Leda's husband).
- Pyrrha: daughter of Epimetheus and the first woman Pandora. She and her cousin-husband Deucalion repopulated the earth after the Great Flood that ended the Bronze Age.
- Sciron: son of Poseidon, a Corinthian bandit who was defeated by Theseus on his way to Athens.
- Tantalus: son of Zeus and the nymph Plouto, a Lydian king, father of Pelops and Niobe.
- Telegonus: son of the minor goddess Circe and Odysseus. He accidentally killed his father with a lance tipped with the venom of a stingray. He married his father's wife Penelope.
- Theseus: son of Poseidon (the sea god) and Aethra, the wife of king Aegeus.
- Tityos: a giant, son of Zeus and Elara.
- Zetes: son of Boreas (the Greek god of the cold north wind and the bringer of winter) and Oreithyia, daughter of King Erechtheus of Athens. His brother was Calais, and they are collectively known as Boreads.
- Zethus: son of Zeus and Antiope, twin brother of Amphion, co-founder of Thebes.

== Egyptian mythology ==
- Imhotep: son of Thoth. One of the greatest builders in Ancient Egypt.
- Apis: bull, son of Ptah. He became god of virility after his death and merged with Osiris, god of Underworld.
- Petesuchos: sacred crocodile. Considered as son of Sobek or his incarnation.

== Roman mythology ==
- Aeneas: Trojan hero, son of Venus, goddess of love and Prince Anchises. He fled to Italy and became the ancestor of Romulus and Remus, founders of Rome
- Bacchus: son of Jupiter and Semele, a mortal. The Roman god of agriculture, wine and fertility, and their equivalent of the Greek god Dionysus, the name Bacchus being another name used by the Romans for Dionysus.
- Hercules: son of Jupiter and Alcmene, the Roman equivalent of the Greek Heracles.
- Romulus and Remus: twin sons of Mars and Rhea Silvia, co-founders of Rome.
- Turnus: son of Venilia

== African mythology ==
- Cetewayo: Zulu king. According to Mayomberos, Cetewayo was considered as son or incarnation of god Nsasi.
- First kings of Lozi people (including Yeta I, Mwanasolundwi Muyunda Mumbo wa Mulonga, Inyambo and Ingulamwa) were sons of Nyambe, god of Sky.
- Ju: half-brother of Nyikang. Son of Okwa and Angwat, a crocodile goddess.
- Kabundungulu: twin brother and rival of Sudika-Mbambi. Son of the daughter of Sun and Moon and a mortal.
- Moni-Mambu: trickster in Kongo tales. He was son of Nzambi a Mpungu (according to some legends).
- Mwindo: demigod from Nyanga people.
- Ntikuma and his brothers: son of Anansi, spider god of Akan traditions. The wisest of Anansi's sons. He is often victims of his father's tricks. Sons of Anansi are composed of Nankonhwea, Afudohwedohwe, Tikelenkelen, See Trouble, Road Builder, River Drinker, Skinner, Stone Thrower and Cushion/Ground Pillow and a girl, Anansewa.
- Nyikang and his brothers, Duwat and Moi, and sisters, Nyadway, Ariemker and Bunyung: children of king Okwa and Nyikaya, a crocodile goddess, that their father had taken while she was by the river. Nyikang become the first king of Shilluk kingdom.
- Ryan'gombe: traditional hero from Urundi and Rwanda, he was son of Babinga, chief of evil spirits, and a human who could change shape and turn into a lioness.
- Sudika-mbambi: son of a mortal and the daughter of Sun and Moon. Sudika-Mbambi was the most important hero of the Mbundu people. Helped by Kabungunlu, his twin brother, he traveled to Underworld and fought against monsters and King of Underworld himself. When he died, he becomes god of thunder and justice.
- Tahkar: demigod of justice.
- Zumbi dos Palmares: according to legends around Zumbi, some considered him owned of Orixas or as son of Ogum.

== Philippine mythology ==
- Mayari: daughter of the Tagalog god Bathala and a mortal woman. Goddess of the moon and revolution, ruler of the world at nighttime.
- Tala: daughter of the Tagalog god Bathala and a mortal woman. Goddess of the stars.
- Hanan: daughter of the Tagalog god Bathala and a mortal woman. Goddess of morning.
- Apo Anno: son of a Kankanaey goddess and a mortal.
- Laon: Hiligaynon demigod slayer of Mount Kanlaon's mad dragon.
- Oryol: daughter of the Bicolano god Asuang and a mortal. Half-snake demigoddess who brought peace to the land.
- Labaw Dongon: son of the Suludnon goddess Alunsina (or Laun Sina) and the mortal Datu Paubari.
- Humadapnon: son of the Suludnon goddess Alunsina (or Laun Sina) and the mortal Datu Paubari.
- Dumalapdap: son of the Suludnon goddess Alunsina (or Laun Sina) and the mortal Datu Paubari.
- Ovug: son of the Ifugao god Dumagid and the mortal Dugai. Cut in half, his first reanimation is in the skyworld, causing lightning and sharp thunder, while the second reanimation in the earthworld causes low thunder.
- Takyayen: son of the Tinguian goddess Gagayoma and the mortal Apolinatu.

== Manipuri mythology ==
- Chothe Thangwai Pakhangba: Son of Sky God Soraren
- Irai Leima: A human manifestation of Goddess Leimarel Sidabi
- Nongshaba: Son of Salailen Sidaba, the creator of Universe
- Nongthang Leima: Daughter of sky God Soraren

== Hindu mythology ==
- Abhimanyu: son of Arjuna and Subhadra; incarnation of Varcha, son of moon-god Chandra.
- Arjuna: spiritual-son of Indra, biological-son of Pandu and Kunti; incarnation of Nara.
- Astika: son of Sage Jaratkaru and snake-goddess Manasa, sister of Vasuki.
- Bhima: spiritual-son of Vayu; biological son of Kunti and Pandu.
- Bhishma: son of Kuru King Shantanu and the goddess Ganga; incarnation of a Vasu.
- Dhristadyumna: materialised out of a ritual fire-altar; quasi-son of fire god Agni; son of King Drupada.
- Draupadi: materialised out of a ritual fire-altar; quasi-daughter of fire god Agni; daughter of King Drupada.
- Drona: avatar of Brihaspati and son of the sage Bharadvaja.
- Ghatotkacha: born of Pandava prince Bhima and the demoness Hidimbi.
- Hanuman: son of Vayu.
- Iravan: son of Pandava prince Arjuna and the naga (snake) princess Ulupi.
- Karna: spiritual-son of sun-god Surya, and biological son of Kunti.
- Lakshmana: incarnation of Shesha.
- Nakula: spiritual-son of one of the Ashvins, and biological son of Pandu and Madri.
- Pururavas: son of Budha and Ila, daughter/son of Vaivasvata Manu
- Sahadeva: spiritual-son of one of the Ashvins and biological son of Pandu and Madri.
- Sita: incarnation of Lakshmi; daughter of Bhumi, the earth goddess.
- Sugriva: son of sun god Surya.
- Vali: son of the king of the devas and heaven, Indra.
- Yudhishthira: spiritual-son of the god of death and justice Yama, and biological son of Kunti and Pandu.

== Norse mythology ==
- Sæmingr: king of Norway, son of god Odin and queen Skade.
- Bragi: another son of Odin.
- Sigi: son of Odin and the ancestor of the Völsung lineage.
- Sleipnir: child of Loki and Svaðilfari.

== Celtic mythology ==
- Cú Chulainn: son of the god Lugh and the mortal woman Deichtine.
- Diarmuid Ua Duibhne: son of the god Donn and one of the Fianna.
- Fráech: son of the goddess Bébinn and a man of Connaught.

== Japanese mythology ==
- Minamoto no Yoshiie: Japanese samurai who, according to legend was a son or avatar of the deity Hachiman.
- Kintarō: Japanese folk hero who, according to some legends was a son of Raijin.
- Abe no Seimei: A famous onmyōji from the Heian period his mother Kuzunoha, was a Kitsune, a divine fox.
- Sakanoue no Tamuramaro: Japanese samurai who was an incarnation of Bishamonten.

== Chinese mythology ==
- Erlang Shen: In the Journey to the West, the Jade Emperor's younger sister Yunhua is mentioned to have descended to the mortal realm and given birth to a child named Yang Jian. He would eventually grow up to become a deity himself known as Erlang Shen.
- Hou Yi: A mythological Chinese archer he is sometimes portrayed as a god of archery or a xian descended from heaven to aid mankind. Other times, he is portrayed as either simply half-divine or fully mortal.
- Nezha: Son of Li Jing (deity) and Lady Yin. He was then given the title "Third Lotus Prince" (蓮花三太子) after he became a deity.
- Yuenü: A swordswoman and reincarnation of Jiutian Xuannü.

== Other ==
- Amirani: Georgian culture hero, son of Dali and a mortal hunter
- Gilgamesh: Sumerian king, son of Lugalbanda and Ninsun.
- Māui: Māori, New Zealand.
- Māui: Maui, Hawaii
- Semiramis: Assyrian queen who, according to some legends was daughter of the fish goddess Atargatis or Derketo of Ascalon in Assyria and a mortal.
- Rulers and imperial titles claiming relation to deities.

== Popular fiction ==
- Wonder Woman: In the fictional world of DC Comics, she is Diana, the daughter of Zeus and Hippolyta, queen of the Amazons of Themyscira.
- Percy Jackson: In a series of books by Rick Riordan, Percy is the son of Poseidon and an American woman named Sally Jackson. The Riordan Verse contains many other demigods, such as Annabeth Chase, daughter of Athena, her cousin, Magnus Chase, son of Frey, Jason Grace, son of Jupiter.
- Kratos: In the game series God of War, he is the son of Zeus and Callisto.
- Rain: in the Mortal Kombat fighting game franchise by NetherRealm Studios Rain is a royal demigod Son of Argus from the realm of Edenia, whose desire for power leads to him aligning with the franchise's villains
- Maui: In the Disney movie Moana, he is the son of the man raised by the gods.
- Mathayus, the Scorpion King: After he called Anubis to spare his life to conquer his enemies, Anubis transformed Mathayus into a centaurid scorpion-monster.
- Tsugumi and Datara's child: In the Nintendo DS video game Inuyasha: Secret of the Divine Jewel, she is the demigod daughter of Tsugumi and Datara. After Tsugumi killed her child from the hands of Gorai and the demon mask has been put on her husband, she seals him by using the Lightning Sealing Arrow during the interruption of Tsugumi's and Datara's wedding ceremony in 1000 AD, it reincarnated to an American girl named Janis.
- Goro: In the anime spin-off of Inuyasha, Yashahime: Princess Half-Demon, he is the demigod son of Oharu and Mahiruma.
- Hercules: Son of Zeus in the DC Universe.
- Bigby Wolf: In the game series The Wolf Among Us and the comic series Fables, he is the son of Boreas (Greek god of the north wind) and Winter Wolf.
- In Krapopolis, the main character, Tyrannis, and his maternal half-sister, Stupendous, are demigods birthed by the goddess, Deliria, and fathered by the hybrid monster, Shlub, and the cyclops, Donny, who appeared in the episode, "Prometheus", respectively.
- In Honkai: Star Rail, the Chrysos Heirs are a group of demigods born of golden blood after the Titans of Amphoreus fell. According to the prophecy, a Chrysos Heir who chosen few possess the capacity to assume divinity that conquers a Coreflame's Trial will inherit its respective Titan's divinity to become a demigod.
