= Go Toward the Light =

1988 American television film by Mike Robe

- Genre: Drama
- Based on: Go Toward the Light by Chris Oyler
- Written by: Susan Nanus; Beth Polson
- Directed by: Mike Robe
- Starring: Linda Hamilton; Richard Thomas; Joshua Harris; Ned Beatty; Piper Laurie
- Theme music composer: James Newton Howard
- Country of origin: United States
- Original language: English

Production
- Executive producer: Beth Polson
- Producer: Nick Lombardo
- Cinematography: Eric Van Haren Noman
- Editor: Jim Oliver
- Running time: 93 minutes
- Production companies: Corapeake / Polson Company; The Polson Company

Original release
- Network: CBS
- Release: November 1, 1988

Go Toward the Light is a 1988 television film starring Linda Hamilton, Joshua Harris and Richard Thomas. The film first aired on CBS on November 1, 1988.

== Premise ==
A young couple face the realities of life with their hemophiliac child who is diagnosed with AIDS from contaminated haemophilia blood products. The young couple (Linda Hamilton, Richard Thomas) try to prepare their young son (Joshua Harris) for his inevitable fate.

The film is based on a book by Chris Oyler, which told true story of her 9-year-old son who died of AIDS in 1986.

== Cast ==
- Linda Hamilton as Claire Madison
- Richard Thomas as Greg Madison
- Joshua Harris as Ben Madison
- Piper Laurie as Margo
- Ned Beatty as George
- Gary Bayer as Dr. Gladstone
- Rosemary Dunsmore as Sally
- Steven Eckholdt as Jeff
- Brian Bonsall as Zack Madison
- Mitchell Allen as Brian Madison
- Brian Lando as Keith
- Ryan McWhorter as Randy
- Jack Tate as Rick
