= Shadows in the Storm =

1988 film directed and written by Terrell Tannen

- Directed by: Terrell Tannen
- Written by: Terrell Tannen
- Produced by: A.J. Cervantes; Ronald S Altbach; Strathford Hamilton; J. Daniel Dusek
- Starring: Ned Beatty; Mia Sara; Michael Madsen; James Widdoes; Donna Mitchell; Joe Dorsey
- Cinematography: John J. Connor
- Edited by: Marcy Hamilton
- Music by: Sasha Matson
- Distributed by: Vidmark Entertainment
- Release date: October 13, 1988 (Sitges Film Festival)
- Running time: 90 minutes
- Country: United States
- Language: English

Shadows in the Storm is a 1988 horror film directed by Terrell Tannen, and starring Mia Sara, Ned Beatty, Donna Mitchell, Michael Madsen, and Joe Dorsey.

== Plot ==
Thelonious Pitt, a daydreaming businessman, goes to the Redwood Forests of California. There, he meets a beautiful woman, Melanie. She looks like the woman he has been seeing in his dreams.

At the river late at night, when Melanie's husband finds them, he attacks Thelonious until Melanie pulls out a pistol and fires three shots at her husband. His body goes into the river. That is when the nightmare begins.

== Cast ==
- Ned Beatty as Thelonious Pitt
- Mia Sara as Melanie
- Michael Madsen as Earl
- Donna Mitchell as Elizabeth
- James Widdoes as Victor
- Joe Dorsey as Birkenstock (Joe Dorcey)
- William Bumiller as Terwilliger
- Peter Fox as Hotel Clerk
- Troy Evans as Detective Harris
- Bob Gould as Detective Wand
- Tracy Brooks Swope as Mercy
- Ramon Angeloni as Birkenstock's Assistant
- Marta Goldstein as Terwilliger's Girlfriend

== Home video ==
Shadows in the Storm was released on VHS the week of March 18, 1990 by Vidmark Entertainment.

== Reception ==
Fred Haeseker of the Calgary Herald called the film, "a blunt stab at a traditional California film noir" and that it "stirs up not so much lurid menace as unrelieved tedium."

Ray and Brenda Tevis wrote in their book The Image of Librarians in Cinema, 1917-1999, Shadows in the Storm continues to manifest male reel librarians in most unflattering images.

Jim Murphy of The Age wrote : "Neophyte thriller fans should enjoy it hugely."
