= Ned Beatty =

American actor (1937–2021)

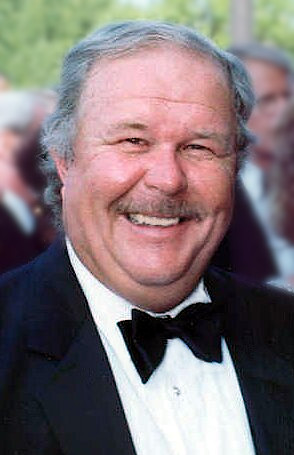
- Beatty at the 42nd Primetime Emmy Awards in 1990
- Born: Ned Thomas Beatty; July 6, 1937; Louisville, Kentucky, U.S.
- Died: June 13, 2021 (aged 83); Los Angeles, California, U.S.
- Occupation: Actor
- Years active: 1956–2013
- Spouses: Walta Chandler (m. 1959; div. 1968); Belinda Rowley (m. 1971; div. 1979); Dorothy Lindsay (m. 1979; div. 1998); Sandra Johnson (m. 1999)
- Children: 8

Ned Thomas Beatty (July 6, 1937 – June 13, 2021) was an American actor. In a career that spanned five decades, he appeared in more than 160 film and television roles. Throughout his career, Beatty gained a reputation for being "the busiest actor in Hollywood".

Beatty's extensive filmography included Deliverance (1972), White Lightning (1973), All the President's Men (1976), Network (1976), Superman (1978), Superman II (1980), Back to School (1986), Rudy (1993), Shooter (2007) and voice roles in Toy Story 3 (2010), and Rango (2011). He also had the series regular role of Stanley Bolander in the first three seasons of the hit NBC TV drama Homicide: Life on the Street.

Beatty was nominated for an Academy Award, two Emmy Awards, an MTV Movie Award for Best Villain, and a Golden Globe Award; he also won a Drama Desk Award.

== Early life ==
Beatty was born on July 6, 1937, in Louisville, Kentucky, to Margaret (née Fortney) and Charles William Beatty. He had an older sister, Mary. In 1947, Beatty began singing in gospel and barbershop quartets in St. Matthews, Kentucky, and at his local church. He graduated from Eastern High School and subsequently received a scholarship to sing in the a cappella choir at Transylvania University in Lexington, Kentucky; he attended but did not graduate.

In 1956, Beatty made his stage debut at age 19, appearing in Wilderness Road, an outdoor historical pageant located in Berea, Kentucky. During his first ten years of theater, he worked at Barter Theatre in Abingdon, Virginia, the State Theatre of Virginia. Returning to Kentucky, Beatty worked in the Louisville area through the mid-1960s, at the Clarksville Little Theater (Indiana) and the newly founded Actors Theater of Louisville. His time at the latter included a run as Willy Loman in Death of a Salesman in 1966.

== Career ==
Throughout his career, Beatty had no regrets about mostly playing only supporting roles: "[Leading roles] are more trouble than they're worth. I feel sorry for people in a star position. It's unnatural".

=== 1970s ===
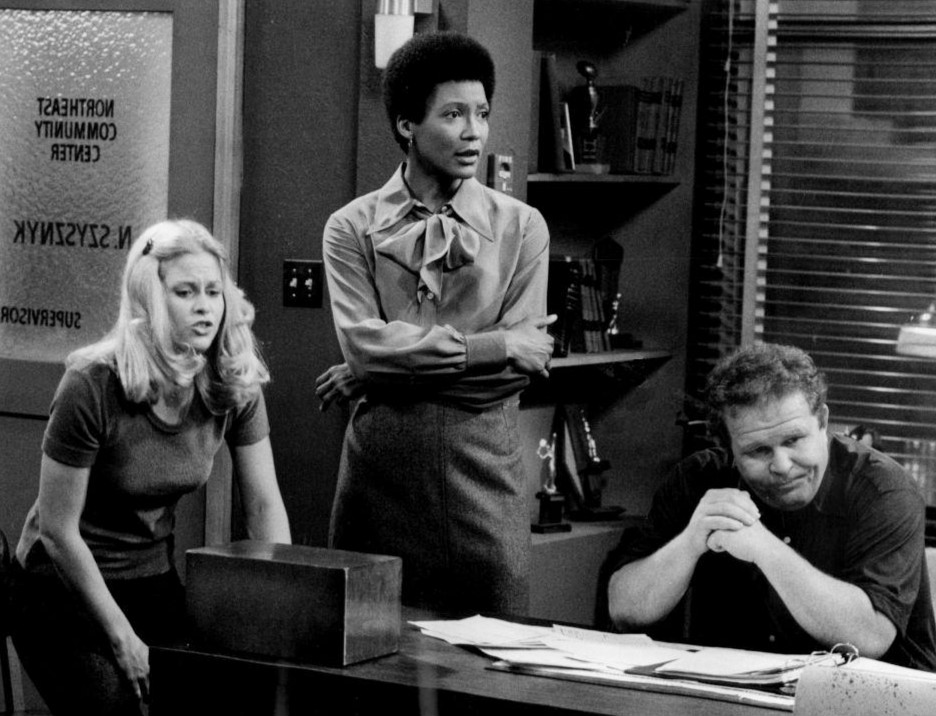
Ned Beatty with Susan Lanier and Olivia Cole from the short-lived television program Szysznyk in 1977

In 1972, Beatty made his film debut as Bobby Trippe in Deliverance, starring Jon Voight and Burt Reynolds, and set in northern Georgia. Beatty's character is forced to strip at gunpoint by two mountain men who humiliate and rape him, a scene so shocking that it is still referred to as a screen milestone. Beatty admitted that most of the people who worked on the film did not want to do that scene, but it was an important one. The film was the fifth highest grossing that year, and also featured "Dueling Banjos" as its theme tune, which went on to be a number one hit record. In 1972, he also appeared in The Life and Times of Judge Roy Bean, a western with Paul Newman.

In 1973, Beatty had roles in The Thief Who Came to Dinner, The Last American Hero, and White Lightning. The latter film reunited Beatty with his Deliverance co-star Burt Reynolds. He also appeared in an episode of the TV series The Waltons that year, as well as the TV movie The Marcus-Nelson Murders, which was the pilot for the series Kojak. The next year, he appeared in the television miniseries The Execution of Private Slovik and in the two-part episode of The Rockford Files, "Profit and Loss". In 1975, he appeared in W.W. and the Dixie Dancekings, in Robert Altman's Nashville, and as Colonel Hollister in the M*A*S*H episode, "Dear Peggy". He appeared in the NBC-TV movie Attack on Terror: The FBI vs. the Ku Klux Klan as Deputy Sheriff Ollie Thompson (1975). Beatty also made an appearance on Gunsmoke in "The Hiders" episode in 1975.

Beatty received his only Academy Award nomination, for Best Supporting Actor category for the acclaimed film Network (1976), portraying a television network's bombastic but shrewd chairman of the board who convinces the mad Howard Beale character (portrayed by Peter Finch) that corporation-led global dehumanization is not only inevitable, but is also a good thing. Neither Beatty nor William Holden, who shared the lead role with Finch, won an Oscar. The other three acting awards besides the best supporting actor category were swept by Network performers: Best Actor for Peter Finch, Best Actress for Faye Dunaway, and Best Supporting Actress for Beatrice Straight. The Best Supporting Actor award went to Jason Robards for his role in All the President's Men, which also starred Beatty.

In 1976, he also appeared in The Big Bus, Silver Streak, and Mikey and Nicky. In 1977, he returned to work with John Boorman in Exorcist II: The Heretic (1977), and appeared in "The Final Chapter", the first episode of the television series Quinn Martin's Tales of the Unexpected. During 1977-78, he starred in the short-lived sitcom Szysznyk on CBS.

In 1978, Beatty appeared in Gray Lady Down (1978), a drama aboard a submarine starring Charlton Heston. The film is significant chiefly for being the screen debut of Christopher Reeve, Beatty's future co-star. Later that year, Beatty was cast by Richard Donner to portray Lex Luthor's inept henchman Otis in Superman: The Movie (1978), as he would in the 1980 sequel, where his character is seen being left behind in prison. He received his first nomination for Emmy Award for Outstanding Lead Actor in a Miniseries or a Special for the television series Friendly Fire (1979). In 1979, he was also seen in Wise Blood, directed by John Huston, and 1941, directed by Steven Spielberg.

=== 1980s ===
In 1980, Beatty appeared in Ronald Neame's film Hopscotch with Walter Matthau. In 1981, Beatty appeared in the comedy/science fiction film The Incredible Shrinking Woman, directed by Joel Schumacher and starring Lily Tomlin. In 1982, Beatty returned to work with Richard Donner and Richard Pryor in the comedy The Toy. Beatty worked with Burt Reynolds again in the auto-racing farce Stroker Ace (1983).

In the middle of the 1980s, Beatty appeared in the comedy film Restless Natives (1985), directed by Michael Hoffman. By the end of the 1980s, Beatty appeared in another comedy film, as the academic "Dean Martin" in Back to School (1986), starring Rodney Dangerfield. He played a corrupt cop in the 1987 American neo-noir crime film The Big Easy, directed by Jim McBride and starring Dennis Quaid, and continued with a spy drama, The Fourth Protocol (1987), opposite Michael Caine and Pierce Brosnan.

In 1988, Beatty appeared with the main character Thelonious Pitt in Shadows in the Storm, and reunited with Burt Reynolds and Christopher Reeve for the comedy film Switching Channels, his fifth time in a movie with Reynolds. He appeared in Purple People Eater (1988), portraying a simple grandfather. In 1989, Beatty made Chattahoochee, portraying Dr. Harwood. He had a recurring role as Ed Conner, the father of John Goodman's character Dan Conner on the TV comedy series Roseanne (1989–1994).

=== 1990s ===
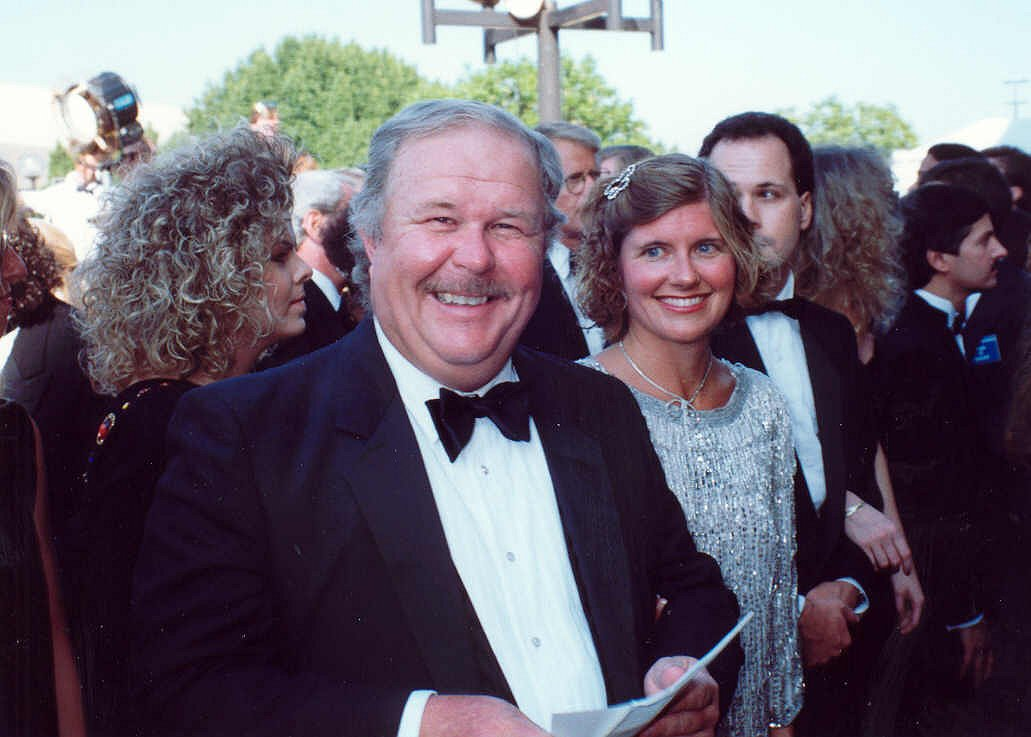
Beatty at the 1990 Annual Emmy Awards

Entering the 1990s, Beatty gained his third nomination for an Emmy Award for Outstanding Supporting Actor in a Miniseries or a Special category for Last Train Home (1990). A year later, he appeared in the British film Hear My Song (1991), in which he portrayed tenor Josef Locke, for which he was nominated for a Golden Globe Award for Best Supporting Actor – Motion Picture.

In 1990, Beatty worked again with Linda Blair in Repossessed (1990), a spoof of The Exorcist. He appeared in the Marvel Comics superhero adventure Captain America (1990). He portrayed the father of the bride in Prelude to a Kiss (1992), opposite Meg Ryan and Alec Baldwin. In 1993, he appeared in the true story based film Rudy, playing a Notre Dame Fighting Irish football fan whose son, against all odds, makes the school's football team. In 1992, he played Blanche Devereaux's developmentally disabled older brother in the TV show The Golden Palace. Beatty starred in the television series Homicide: Life on the Street as Detective Stanley Bolander for its first three seasons (1993–1995).

Beatty made the 1994 science-fiction film Replikator (1994) and mystery-comedy Radioland Murders. In 1995, he worked with Sean Connery and Laurence Fishburne in the thriller Just Cause. He appeared as Judge Roy Bean in the TV miniseries adaptation of Larry McMurtry's western novel, Streets of Laredo (1995). David Fincher and Andrew Kevin Walker wanted Beatty to play John Doe in Seven (1995), because of his resemblance to the 1969 composite sketch of the Zodiac Killer; Beatty declined, describing the script as the "most evil thing I've ever read." He appeared in a 1998 sports-drama film written and directed by Spike Lee and starring Denzel Washington, He Got Game. In 1999, Beatty returned to work with Cookie's Fortune, Life, and Spring Forward.

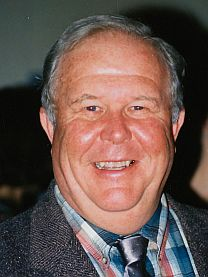
Beatty in 1996

=== 2000s ===
In the beginning of the 2000s, he was a member of the original cast of the television police drama reunion film Homicide: The Movie (2000), reprising his role of Detective Stanley Bolander. In 2002, he appeared in Peter Hewitt's film Thunderpants. In 2003, he portrayed a simple sheriff in Where the Red Fern Grows.

Beatty also enjoyed a career as a stage actor, including a run in the Broadway and London productions of Cat on a Hot Tin Roof with Brendan Fraser and Frances O'Connor. He won a Drama Desk Award for Outstanding Featured Actor in a Play for playing Big Daddy in a production of Cat on a Hot Tin Roof.

In the middle of the 2000s, Beatty appeared in the television film The Wool Cap (2004) with William H. Macy, and in 2005, in an American independent film directed and written by Ali Selim, Sweet Land. In March 2006, Beatty received the RiverRun International Film Festival's "Master of Cinema" Award (the highest honor of the festival), in Winston-Salem, North Carolina.

At the end of the 2000s, Beatty portrayed a corrupt U.S. Senator in the film version of Stephen Hunter's novel Point of Impact titled Shooter (2007), directed by Antoine Fuqua and starring Mark Wahlberg, Michael Peña, and Danny Glover; in a drama film written and directed by Paul Schrader, The Walker (2007), and as the honorable U.S. Congressman Doc Long in the true story Charlie Wilson's War (2007), with Tom Hanks and Julia Roberts, directed by Mike Nichols. He also worked with Tommy Lee Jones in the thriller In the Electric Mist (2009).

=== 2010s ===
In 2010, Beatty starred in the thriller The Killer Inside Me (2010), which was part of the Sundance Film Festival. He also voiced Lots-O'-Huggin' Bear in the 2010 Disney/Pixar film Toy Story 3 (2010) opposite Charlie Wilson's War costar Tom Hanks, who was reprising his role of Woody from the first two films. In 2011, Beatty worked with actor Johnny Depp and director Gore Verbinski in the animated film Rango (2011), playing the role of Tortoise John. He appeared briefly in the film Funny Guy and in the film Rampart (2011), opposite Woody Harrelson, which is set in 1999 Los Angeles. Beatty's final television appearance was in sitcom television series Go On (2013), starring Matthew Perry.

Beatty's next film was The Big Ask (2013), a dark comedy about three couples who head to the desert to help their friend heal after the death of his mother. The film featured Gillian Jacobs, Zachary Knighton, David Krumholtz, Melanie Lynskey, Ahna O'Reilly, and Jason Ritter, and was directed by his son Thomas Beatty and Rebecca Fishman. His other 2013 film was Baggage Claim, an American comedy film directed by David E. Talbert and written by Talbert based on his book of the same name, opposite Paula Patton, Adam Brody, Djimon Hounsou, Taye Diggs, Christina Milian and Derek Luke, which was also Beatty's final film role before his retirement.

== Personal life and death ==
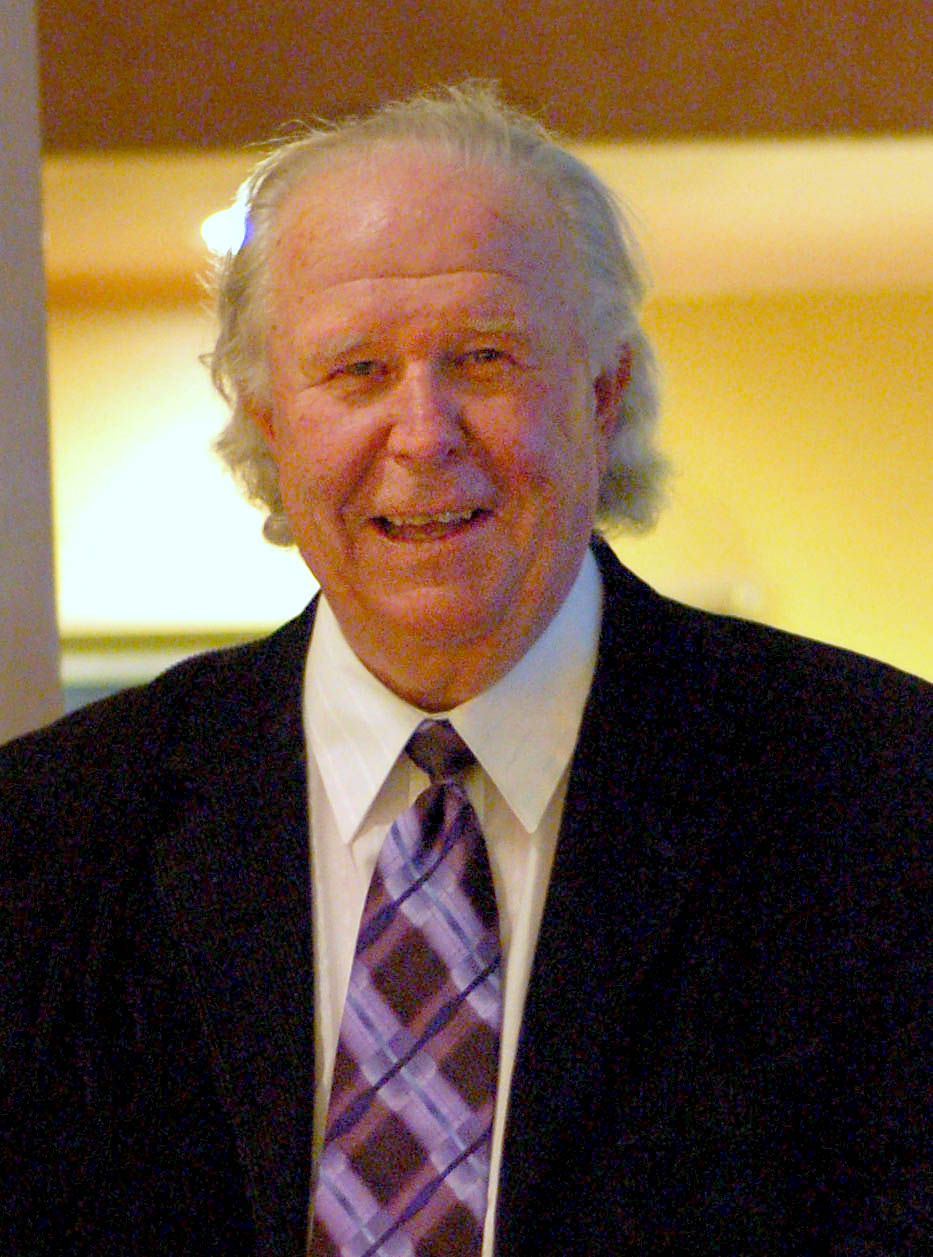
Beatty in 2006

Beatty was married four times. His first wife was Walta Chandler; they were married from 1959 until 1968 and had four children. His second wife was actress Belinda Rowley; they were married from 1971 to 1979 and had two children. His third wife was Dorothy Adams "Tinker" Lindsay; they were married from June 28, 1979, to March 1998 and had two children. His fourth wife was Sandra Johnson; they were married on November 20, 1999, and lived in Los Angeles, California. They also maintained a residence in Karlstad, Minnesota.

Beatty was not related to fellow Hollywood star Warren Beatty, also born in 1937. When asked if they were related, Beatty had been known to joke that Warren was his "illegitimate uncle".

On June 29, 2012, Beatty attended a 40th anniversary screening of Deliverance at Warner Bros., with Burt Reynolds, Ronny Cox and Jon Voight.

He supported Jesse Jackson's 1988 presidential campaign.

Beatty died of natural causes in his sleep at his home in Los Angeles, California on June 13, 2021, at the age of 83, and he was cremated with his ashes given to his widow.

== Filmography ==
=== Film ===
Year	Films	Role	Notes
1972	Deliverance	Bobby Trippe	
1972	The Life and Times of Judge Roy Bean	Tector Crites	
1973	The Thief Who Came to Dinner	Deams	
1973	The Last American Hero	Hackel	
1973	White Lightning	Sheriff J.C. Connors	
1975	W.W. and the Dixie Dancekings	'Country Bull' Jenkins	
1975	Nashville	Delbert Reese	
1976	All the President's Men	Martin Dardis	
1976	The Big Bus	Scotty 'Shorty Scotty'	
1976	Network	Arthur Jensen	Nominated – Academy Award for Best Supporting Actor
1976	Silver Streak	FBI Agent Bob Stevens / Bob Sweet	
1976	Mikey and Nicky	Kinney	
1977	Exorcist II: The Heretic	Edwards	
1977	Alambrista!	Anglo Coyote	
1978	Gray Lady Down	Mickey	
1978	The Great Bank Hoax	Julius Taggart	
1978	Superman	Otis	
1979	Promises in the Dark	Bud Koenig	
1979	Wise Blood	Hoover Shoates	
1979	1941	Ward Douglas	
1980	The American Success Company	Mr. Elliott	
1980	Hopscotch	G.P. "See you next Tuesday" Myerson	
1980	Superman II	Otis	
1981	The Incredible Shrinking Woman	Dan Beame	
1982	The Toy	Sydney Morehouse	
1982	The Ballad of Gregorio Cortez	Lynch Mob Leader	
1983	Stroker Ace	Clyde Torkle	
1983	Touched	Herbie	
1985	Restless Natives	Bender	
1986	Back to School	Dean David Martin	
1987	The Big Easy	Jack Kellom	
1987	The Fourth Protocol	General Pavel Borisov	
1987	Rolling Vengeance	'Tiny' Doyle	
1987	The Trouble with Spies	Harry Lewis	
1988	Shadows in the Storm	Thelonious Pitt	
1988	Switching Channels	Roy Ridnitz	
1988	The Unholy	Lieutenant Stern	
1988	Midnight Crossing	Ellis	
1988	After the Rain	Kozen	
1988	Purple People Eater	Sam Johnson	
1989	Time Trackers	Harry Orth	
1989	Physical Evidence	James Nicks	
1989	Tennessee Nights	Charlie Kiefer	
1989	Chattahoochee	Dr. Harwood	
1989	Ministry of Vengeance	Reverend Bloor	
1990	Going Under	Admiral Malice	
1990	Big Bad John	Charlie Mitchelle	
1990	Angel Square	Officer Ozzie O'Driscoll	
1990	A Cry in the Wild	Jake Holcomb	
1990	Repossessed	Ernest Weller	
1990	Fat Monroe	Fat Monroe	Short
1990	Captain America	Sam Kolawetz	
1991	Hear My Song	Josef Locke	Nominated – Golden Globe Award for Best Supporting Actor – Motion Picture
1992	Blind Vision	Sergeant Logan	
1992	Prelude to a Kiss	Dr. Boyle	
1993	Warren Oates: Across the Border	Narrator	Documentary
1993	Rudy	Daniel Ruettiger, Sr.	
1993	Ed and His Dead Mother	Uncle Benny	
1994	Replikator	Inspector Victor Valiant	
1994	Outlaws: The Legend of O.B. Taggart	Unknown	
1994	Radioland Murders	General Walt Whalen	
1995	The Affair	Colonel Banning	
1995	Just Cause	McNair	
1997	The Curse of Inferno	Moles Huddenel	
1998	He Got Game	Warden Wyatt	
1999	Cookie's Fortune	Lester Boyle	
1999	Life	Dexter Wilkins	
2000	Spring Forward	Murph	
2002	This Beautiful Life	Bum	
2002	Thunderpants	General Ed Sheppard	
2003	Where the Red Fern Grows	Sheriff Abe McConnell	
2005	Sweet Land	Harmo	
2007	Shooter	Senator Charles F. Meachum	
2007	The Walker	Jack Delorean	
2007	Charlie Wilson's War	Clarence 'Doc' Long	
2009	In the Electric Mist	Twinky LeMoyne	
2010	The Killer Inside Me	Chester Conway	
2010	Toy Story 3	Lots-O'-Huggin' Bear	Voice; IGN Award for Favorite Villain; Nominated –IGN Movie Award for Best Ensemble Cast; Nominated – MTV Movie Award for Best Villain
2011	Rango	Tortoise John	Voice
2011	Rampart	Hartshorn	
2013	The Big Ask	Old Man Carl	
2013	Baggage Claim	Mr. Donaldson	

=== Television ===
Year	Title	Role	Notes
1972	Footsteps	Frank Powell	Television film
1973	The Waltons	Curtis Norton	Episode: "The Bicycle"
1973	Kojak	Det. Dan Corrigan	Episode: "The Marcus-Nelson Murders"
1973	Dying Room Only	Tom King	Television film
1974	The Rockford Files	Leon Fielding	Episode: "Profit and Loss"
1974	The Execution of Private Slovik	Father Stafford	Television film
1975	Lucas Tanner	Harold Ogden	Episode: "A Touch of Bribery"
1975	The Deadly Tower	Allan Crum	Television film
1975	M*A*S*H	Colonel Hollister	Episode: "Dear Peggy"
1975	Gunsmoke	Karp	Episode: "The Hiders"
1975	Petrocelli	Gage	Episode: "Death Ride"
1975	Attack on Terror: The FBI vs. the Ku Klux Klan	Deputy Sheriff Ollie Thompson	Television film
1975	The Rookies	Frank Forest	Episode: "Shadow of a Man"
1976	Hunter	Lt. Kluba	Unaired pilot for 1977 series
1976	Hawaii Five-O	Keith Caldwell	Episode: "Oldest Profession - Latest Price"
1976	NBC Special Treat	Big Henry	Episode: "Big Henry and the Polka Dot Kid"
1977	Quinn Martin's Tales of the Unexpected	McClaskey	Episode: "The Final Chapter"
1977	Tail Gunner Joe	Sylvester	Television film
1977	The Streets of San Francisco	Eddie Boggs	Episode: "Hang Tough"
1977	Delvecchio	Wakefield	Episode: "The Madness Within" parts 1 and 2
1977	Nashville 99	Randy Blair	Episode: "Sing Me a Song to Die By"
1977	Lucan	Larry MacElwaine	Television film
1977	Our Town	Dr. Frank Gibbs	Television film
1977	Visions	Anglo Coyote / Pinky	2 episodes
1977–1978	Szysznyk	Nick Szysznyk	15 episodes
1978	A Question of Love	Dwayne Stabler	Television film
1979	Friendly Fire	Gene Mullen	Nominated – Emmy Award for Outstanding Lead Actor in a Miniseries or a Special
1980	Guyana Tragedy: The Story of Jim Jones	Congressman Leo Ryan	Television film
1981	The Violation of Sarah McDavid	Dr. Walter Keys	Television film
1981	Splendor in the Grass	Ace Stamper	Television film
1982	A Woman Called Golda	Senator Durward	Television film
1982	Faerie Tale Theatre	The King	Episode: "Rumpelstiltskin"
1983	Kentucky Woman	Luke Telford	Television film
1984	The Last Days of Pompeii	Diomed	Miniseries
1984	The Haunting of Barney Palmer	Cole Scholar	Television film
1984	Murder, She Wrote	Chief Roy Gunderson	Episode: "The Murder of Sherlock Holmes"
1984	Celebrity	Otto Leo	Miniseries
1985	Alfred Hitchcock Presents	Larry Broome	Episode: "Pilot"; segment: "Incident in a Small Jail"
1985	Robert Kennedy and His Times	J. Edgar Hoover	Miniseries
1985	Konrad	Mr. Thomas	Television film
1985	Hostage Flight	Art Hofstadter	Television film
1985–1986	Highway to Heaven	Bill Cassidy / Willy The Waver / Melvin Rich	2 episodes
1987	Dolly	John Pacer	1 episode
1988	Go Toward the Light	George	Television film
1989–1994	Roseanne	Ed Conner	6 episodes
1989	Spy	Thomas Ludlow	Television film
1989	Last Train Home	Cornelius van Horne	Nominated – Emmy Award for Outstanding Supporting Actor in a Miniseries or a Special
1989	B.L. Stryker	Ryan Quinn	Episode: "The King of Jazz"
1990	It's Garry Shandling's Show	Himself	Episode: "The Wedding Show"
1990	The Tragedy of Flight 103: The Inside Story	Edward C. Acker	Television film
1992	Road to Avonlea	Wally Higgins	Episode: "The Calamitous Courting of Hetty King"
1992	Trial: The Price of Passion	Scoot Shepard	Television film
1992	Illusions	George Willoughby	Television film
1993	The Golden Palace	Tad Hollingsworth	Episode: "Tad"
1993	The Boys	Herbert Francis "Bert" Greenblatt	6 episodes
1993–1995	Homicide: Life on the Street	Stanley Bolander	33 episodes
1995	Streets of Laredo	Judge Roy Bean	Miniseries
1996	Crazy Horse	Dr. Valentine McGillicuddy	Television film
1996	Gulliver's Travels	Farmer Grultrud	"Part 1"
1999	Hard Time: Hostage Hotel	Tony	Television film
2000	The Wilgus Stories	Fat Monroe	Television film
2000	Homicide: The Movie	Stanley Bolander	Television film
2001	I Was a Rat	Mudduck	Miniseries
2002	Roughing It	Slade	Television film
2004	The Wool Cap	Mr. Gigot	Television film
2007	CSI: Crime Scene Investigation	Dr. David Lowry	Episode: "Sweet Jane"
2008	Law & Order	Judge Malcolm Reynolds	Episode: "Zero"
2013	Go On	Coach Spence	Episode: "Go Deep"

=== Video games ===
Year	Title	Role	Notes
1994	Loadstar: The Legend of Tully Bodine	Sheriff Francis Wompler	Appears in live action video sequences
2010	Toy Story 3: The Video Game	Lots-O'-Huggin' Bear	Voice

=== Theater ===
Year	Title	Role	Notes
1968	The Great White Hope	Various	Replacement
2004	Cat on a Hot Tin Roof	Big Daddy Pollitt	Drama Desk Award for Outstanding Featured Actor in a Play

== Awards and nominations ==
Year	Award	Category	Nominated work	Result	Ref.
1976	Academy Awards	Best Supporting Actor	Network	Nominated	
2004	Drama Desk Awards	Outstanding Featured Actor in a Play	Cat on a Hot Tin Roof	Won	
1991	Golden Globe Awards	Best Supporting Actor – Motion Picture	Hear My Song	Nominated	
2011	MTV Movie & TV Awards	Best Villain	Toy Story 3	Nominated	
1979	Primetime Emmy Awards	Outstanding Lead Actor in a Limited Series or a Special	Friendly Fire	Nominated	
1990	Primetime Emmy Awards	Outstanding Supporting Actor in a Miniseries or a Special	Last Train Home	Nominated	
1999	Online Film & Television Association	Best Ensemble	Cookie's Fortune	Nominated	
2006	RiverRun International Film Festival	Master of Cinema		Honored	

== See also ==
- List of people from the Louisville metropolitan area
