= Brian Bonsall =

American actor, musician (born 1981)

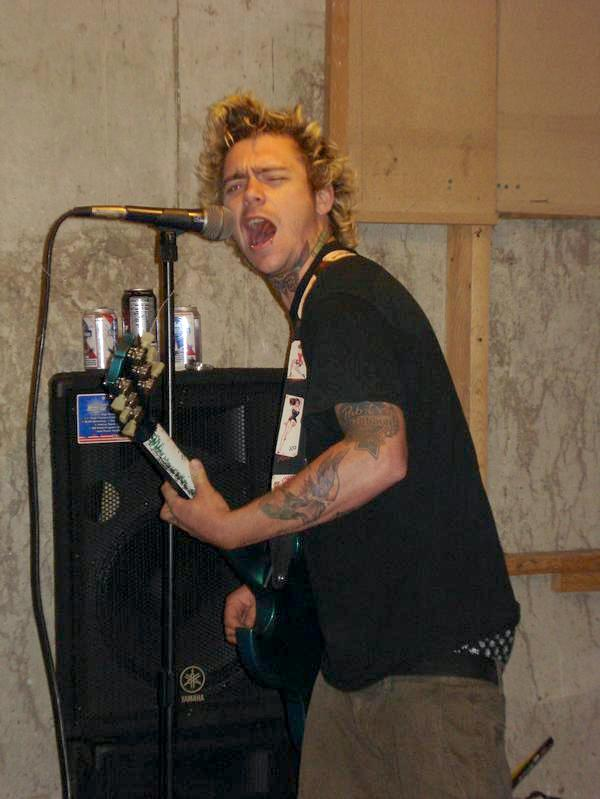
- Bonsall in 2009
- Born: Brian Eric Bonsall; December 3, 1981 (age 44); Torrance, California, U.S.
- Occupations: Actor; musician
- Years active: 1986–1995 (actor); 1998–present (musician)
- Spouse: Courtney Tuck (m. 2017)
- Children: 1

Brian Eric Bonsall (born December 3, 1981) is an American rock musician, singer, guitarist and former child actor. Bonsall is the guitarist for punk rock band The Ataris. He is perhaps best known for his roles as Andrew "Andy" Keaton, the youngest child on the NBC sitcom Family Ties from 1986 until 1989, and Alexander Rozhenko, the son of Worf and K'ehleyr, on Star Trek: The Next Generation from 1992 to 1994.

== Early life and acting career ==
Brian Bonsall was born in Torrance, California, to Garth Bonsall and his wife Kathleen Coleman. In 1986, he began playing the role of Andy Keaton in the sitcom Family Ties. Bonsall won three Young Artist Awards for his performance on the series. He was also nominated for a Young Artist Award for his starring role in the made-for-TV movie Do You Know the Muffin Man? in 1990.

He made his feature film debut in 1992 in the horror film Mikey, playing the title role, a demonic young boy who murders his parents and terrorizes his adoptive parents. This caused controversy in the UK owing to its depiction of a child killer at a time when the murder of James Bulger had raised sensitivity about violent behavior by children. The film was initially passed uncut by the British Board of Film Classification, but its certificate was withdrawn by James Ferman in the wake of the Bulger killing.

Bonsall is known for playing Alexander Rozhenko, son of Star Trek: The Next Generation's Klingon security officer, Worf, a recurring role he played for seven episodes across several seasons.

He played Patrick Swayze's son in the 1993 film Father Hood. In 1994, he starred in the Disney feature film comedy Blank Check and co-starred with Bob Saget in the TV movie comedy Father and Scout. His other acting credits include the TV movie Mother Goose Rock 'n' Rhyme and guest appearances on television series such as The Super Mario Bros. Super Show! and The Young Riders.

== Post-acting career ==
In 1995, Bonsall retired from acting and moved with his mother and stepfather to Boulder, Colorado. He attended Boulder High School, graduating in 2000.

He became a musician, forming the rock band Late Bloomers with his friends in 1998. He has been in the Boulder-based punk bands Thruster and The Light on Adam's Stereo.

In 2016, Bonsall became a member and toured with rock band The Ataris. That same year, he claimed to have been clean and sober since his 2010 arrest: "My drunken run-ins with the law are about 10 years behind me, so I’m pretty happy about that. I’m not proud of my past mistakes but you live and you learn".

== Legal issues ==
On March 28, 2007, Bonsall was arrested on charges of assaulting his girlfriend. He was sentenced to two years of probation on August 31, 2007.

On December 7, 2009, Bonsall was arrested for third degree assault and failure to appear in connection with the 2007 assault on his girlfriend.

In February 2010, Bonsall was arrested on charges of using marijuana in violation of the terms of his release. He was sentenced in April 2010 to two years of probation.

== Personal life ==
In October 2017, Bonsall married Courtney Tuck. On August 24, 2019, Tuck gave birth to their son, Oliver Leon Bonsall.

== Filmography ==
Year	Title	Role	Notes
1986–1989	Family Ties	Andrew "Andy" Keaton	78 episodes
1988	Mickey's 60th Birthday	Andrew "Andy" Keaton	Television special
1988	Go Toward the Light	Zack	Television movie
1988	Day by Day	Andrew "Andy" Keaton	Episode: "Trading Places"
1989	Do You Know the Muffin Man?	Teddy Dollison	Television movie
1989	Booker	Billy	Episode: "Deals and Wheels: Part 1"
1989	On the Television	Googie Chowder	Episode: "Stupid People's Court"
1989	The Super Mario Bros. Super Show!	Brian	Episode: "Koopa Klaus"
1990	Mother Goose Rock 'n' Rhyme	Michael	Television movie
1990	Angel of Death	Josh	Television movie
1990	Married People	Brian	Episode: "To Live and Drive in LA"
1991	The Young Riders		Episode: "Old Scores"
1991	Shades of L.A.	Andy Makowski	2 episodes:
1991	Parker Lewis Can't Lose	Andrew Keaton	Episode: "Civil Wars"
1991	False Arrest	Jason Lukezic	Television movie
1992–1994	Star Trek: The Next Generation	Alexander Rozhenko	7 episodes
1992	Mikey	Mikey Holt	
1993	Distant Cousins	Alex Sullivan	
1993	Father Hood	Eddie Charles	
1994	Blank Check	Preston Waters	
1994	Father and Scout	Michael	Television movie
1994	Lily in Winter	Michael Towler	Television movie
2018	Slaughsages	Bonz	Short film
2022	You're Melting!	Dr. Love	

== Discography ==
The Ataris

- Silver Turn to Rust (2017)

== Awards and nominations ==
Year	Award	Category	Title of work	Result
1988	Young Artist Award	Best Young Actor Under Ten Years of Age in Television or Motion Pictures	Family Ties	Won
1989	Young Artist Award	Best Young Actor Under Nine Years of Age	Family Ties	Won
1990	Young Artist Award	Best Young Actor Starring in a TV Movie, Pilot or Special	Do You Know the Muffin Man?	Nominated
1990	Young Artist Award	Outstanding Performance by an Actor Under Nine Years of Age	Family Ties	Won
