= Joe Dorsey =

American film, stage and television actor

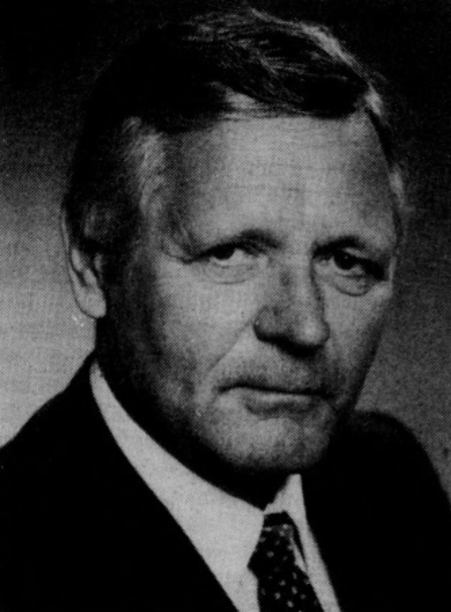
- Dorsey in 1986
- Born: Joseph A. Dorsey; January 15, 1932 (age 94); Florida, U.S.
- Education: American Academy of Dramatic Arts
- Occupations: Film, stage and television actor
- Spouse(s): Sandra Dorsey; Carol Dorsey

Joseph A. Dorsey (born January 15, 1932) is an American film, stage and television actor. He is best known for playing Colonel Douglass in the 1988 film Bat*21.

== Life and career ==
Dorsey was born in Florida. He served in the United States Air Force during the Korean War. During his military service, in 1951, he played Corporal Joe Adams in the stage play A Sleep of Prisoners, which after his discharge, he attended the American Academy of Dramatic Arts, and in 1963, he played Petruchio in the stage play The Taming of the Shrew. He performed in Joseph Papp's Shakespeare in the Park festivals, and in 1965, he began his screen career, appearing in the CBS medical drama television series The Nurses.

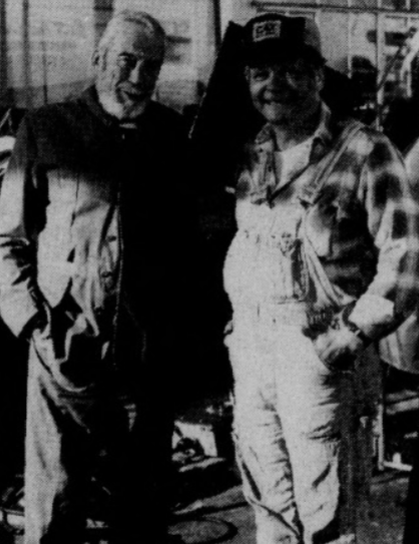
Dorsey (right) with John Huston in the set of Wise Blood in 1977

Later in his career, Dorsey guest-starred in television programs including N.Y.P.D., The Incredible Hulk, The Dukes of Hazzard, Hill Street Blues, Hardcastle and McCormick, Hunter and Remington Steele, and played the recurring role of Bennett J. Devlin in the seventh season of the CBS crime drama television series Murder, She Wrote. In 1988, he starred as Colonel Douglass in the film Bat*21, starring along with Gene Hackman, Danny Glover, Jerry Reed, David Marshall Grant, Clayton Rohner and Erich Anderson. He also appeared in numerous films such as WarGames, The Philadelphia Experiment, Real Genius, Brainstorm, The Great Santini, The Million Dollar Dixie Deliverance, Norma Rae, Pet Sematary Two, Wise Blood, The Longest Yard and Shadows in the Storm.

Dorsey retired from acting in 1992, last appearing in the NBC/CBS crime drama television series In the Heat of the Night.

== Personal life ==
According to the Tucson Citizen, Dorsey lived in Portal, Arizona in 1993.
