= Oyler =

Oyler is a surname. Notable people with the surname include:

- Andy Oyler (1880–1970), American baseball player
- Carol Oyler (born 1947), New Zealand cricketer
- Chris Oyler, American author
- Don Oyler (1907–1989), Canadian curler
- John Vincent Oyler (born 1968), American businessman
- Lauren Oyler, American writer
- Ray Oyler (1937–1981), American baseball player
- Raymond Lee Oyler, American arsonist
- Elsa Giöbel-Oyler (1882–1979), Swedish painter

== See also ==
- Leonhard Euler, Swiss mathematician whose name is pronounced as 'OY-ler'
- Oiler (disambiguation)
