= Kimberly Scott =

American actress

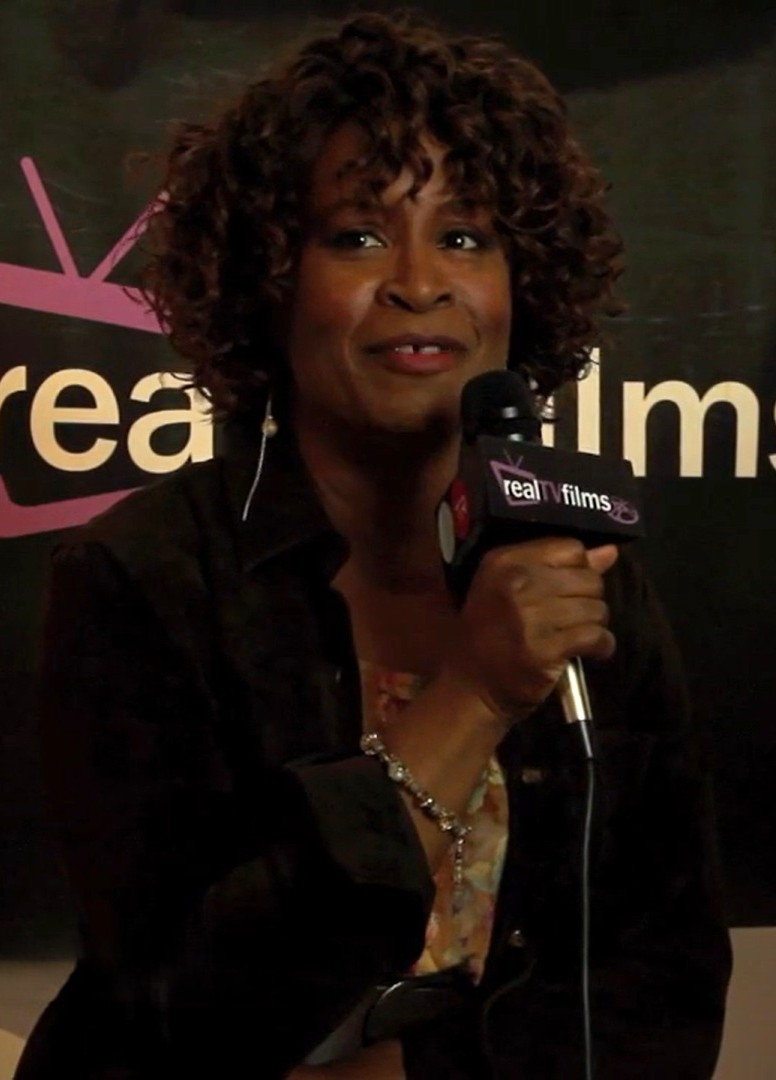
- Scott in 2014
- Born: Kingsville, Texas, U.S.
- Education: Texas A&M University, Kingsville; University of Texas, Austin (BA); Yale University (MFA)
- Occupation: Actress
- Years active: 1988–present

Kimberly Scott is an American actress. She received a Tony Award for Best Featured Actress in a Play nomination for her performance in the 1988 play Joe Turner's Come and Gone. Scott later appeared in films including The Abyss (1989), Flatliners (1990), Batman Forever (1995), Batman & Robin (1997), K-PAX (2001) and Respect (2021).

== Life and career ==
Scott was born in Kingsville, Texas. She attended Texas A&M University-Kingsville and the University of Texas before earning an MFA in 1987 from the Yale School of Drama. In 1988, she was nominated for a Tony Award and a Drama Desk Award for Best Featured Actress in a Play for August Wilson's Joe Turner's Come and Gone.

Scott has appeared in films such as The Abyss, Gross Anatomy, The Waterdance, Drop Zone, The Velocity of Gary, K-PAX, I Am Sam, Impostor, The United States of Leland, Guess Who, World Trade Center and Love & Other Drugs. She frequently appears in the films of Joel Schumacher such as Flatliners, Falling Down and The Client. She is the only actress to appear in Batman films (Batman Forever and Batman & Robin) as different characters.

Scott has also appeared in the television shows MacGyver, Boy Meets World, The Commish, Family Dog, ER, Chicago Hope, Malibu Shores, 3rd Rock from the Sun, JAG, Sister, Sister, The Practice, NYPD Blue, Touched by an Angel, Once and Again, Soul Food, Family Law, Providence, Will & Grace, Wonderfalls, 7th Heaven, and Medium.

In 2007, she appeared in the short films Sponsored By, Under The Gun, Open House, and Time Upon A Once that were made during the reality show On the Lot.

In 2010, she appeared as Mama Nadi in the Oregon Shakespeare Festival's version of Ruined by playwright Lynn Nottage, in 2011, she played tavern owner Mistress Quickly in Shakespeare's Henry IV, Part Two, and in 2018, she played Pistol, Sir Thomas Grey, and the Governor of Harfleur in “Henry V”.

On October 7, 2016, Scott participated in a Yale University panel discussion, “50 Years of Yale Rep: A Conversation with Theatre Makers Present at the Creation, Along the Way, and Today.”

== Filmography ==
=== Film ===
Year	Title	Role	Notes
1989	The Abyss	Lisa 'One Night' Standing	
1989	Gross Anatomy	Nurse Louise	
1990	Downtown	Christine Curren	
1990	Flatliners	Winnie Hicks	
1991	All-American Murder	Cheerleader	Video
1992	The Waterdance	Alice	
1993	Falling Down	Detective Jones	
1994	The Client	Guard Doreen	
1994	Drop Zone	Joanne	
1995	Batman Forever	Margaret	
1996	Black & White: A Love Story	Deandra	
1997	Batman & Robin	Observatory Associate	
1998	Sweet Jane	Dr. Gordon	
1998	The Velocity of Gary	Nurse Adams	
1998	In Quiet Night	Vinette	
1999	Bellyfruit	Carmen Duncan	
2000	Get Your Stuff	Gloria	
2001	K-PAX	Joyce Trexler	
2001	Impostor	Comms Officer	
2001	I Am Sam	Gertie	
2003	The United States of Leland	Myra	
2005	Guess Who	Kimbra	
2005	Touched	Gladys	
2006	World Trade Center	Sergeant King	
2007	The Happiest Day of His Life	Darci	
2007	The Gift: At Risk	Sister Maria	
2008	The Great Buck Howard	Nurse	
2010	Love & Other Drugs	Gail	
2021	Respect	Mama Franklin	

=== Television ===
Year	Title	Role	Notes
1989	A Man Called Hawk	Mary	"Beautiful Are the Stars"
1991	Prison Stories: Women on the Inside	Stacy	TV film
1991	Shannon's Deal	Julia	"First Amendment", "The Inside Man"
1991	MacGyver	Mama Lorraine	"The 'Hood", "The Prometheus Syndrome", "Walking Dead"
1991	Locked Up: A Mother's Rage	Sherisse	TV film
1991-94	The Commish	Lucille Carter	Recurring role
1993	Bodies of Evidence	Maggie Holland	TV series
1993	Caught in the Act	Wilson	TV film
1994	Green Dolphin Beat	Carter	TV film
1994	Father and Scout	Francine	TV film
1995	Chicago Hope	Dr. Kimberly Barnett	"Hello Goodbye"
1996	Boy Meets World	Sonja	"The Heart Is a Lonely Hunter"
1996	Malibu Shores	Officer Guthrie	"Pilot: Parts 1 & 2"
1996	3rd Rock from the Sun	Emily	"The Art of Dick"
1997	Toothless	Gwen	TV film
1998	JAG	NCIS Agent Lisa Viola	"With Intent to Die"
1999	The '60s	Althea Taylor	TV film
1999	Sister, Sister	Professor Weaver	"I Know What You Did in Drama Class"
1999	The Practice	Principal Richwood	"Target Practice"
2000	NYPD Blue	Doctor	"Little Abner"
2000	Touched by an Angel	Enshake	"True Confessions"
2000	Strong Medicine	Mrs. Rose Jenkins	"Brainchild"
2000-01	Family Law	Carla Turner	Recurring role
2001	Once and Again	Lieutenant Saticoy	"The Other End of the Telescope"
2001	Soul Food	Alderman Teresa Davis	"Everything Is Unfolding Perfectly", "Running as Fast as I Can"
2001	Providence	Nina Barnett	"The Honeymoon's Over"
2002	Everybody Loves Raymond	Miss Purcell	"Homework"
2002	Santa, Jr.	Mrs. Taylor	TV film
2003-05	7th Heaven	Greta	"Go Ask Alice", "Why Not Me?", "Mi Familia: Part 2"
2004	Wonderfalls	Officer Hale	"Crime Dog"
2006-07	Medium	Coroner	"Profiles in Terror", "Second Opinion", "No One to Watch Over Me"
2007	Time Upon a Once	Orange Wife	TV film
2019-present	Bob Hearts Abishola	Ogechi	8 episodes
