= Do You Know the Muffin Man? =

- DVD cover
- Genre: Crime; Drama; Mystery
- Written by: Daniel Freudenberger
- Directed by: Gilbert Cates
- Starring: Pam Dawber; John Shea; Stephen Dorff; Brian Bonsall; John Shea; Matthew Laurance; Dee Dee Rescher; Anthony Geary; Natalie West
- Music by: Lee Holdridge
- Country of origin: United States
- Original language: English

Production
- Executive producers: Jon Avnet; Jordan Kerner
- Producer: Daniel Freudenberger
- Cinematography: Mark Irwin
- Editor: Peter Berger
- Running time: 90 minutes
- Production company: The Avnet/Kerner Company

Original release
- Network: CBS
- Release: October 22, 1989

Do You Know the Muffin Man? is a 1989 American made-for-television drama film starring Pam Dawber, John Shea, Stephen Dorff, Brian Bonsall, Anthony Geary and Dee Dee Rescher, directed by Gilbert Cates.

The film, about child abuse in a community day care center, was ranked as the 8th-most-watched television program of the week by the Nielsen Ratings after its initial airing on CBS on October 22, 1989. It was released at the height of the day-care sex-abuse hysteria in the United States.

== Cast ==
- Pam Dawber as Kendra Dollison
- John Shea as Roger Dollison
- Brian Bonsall as Teddy Dollison
- Stephen Dorff as Sandy Dollison
