= Troy Evans (actor) =

American actor

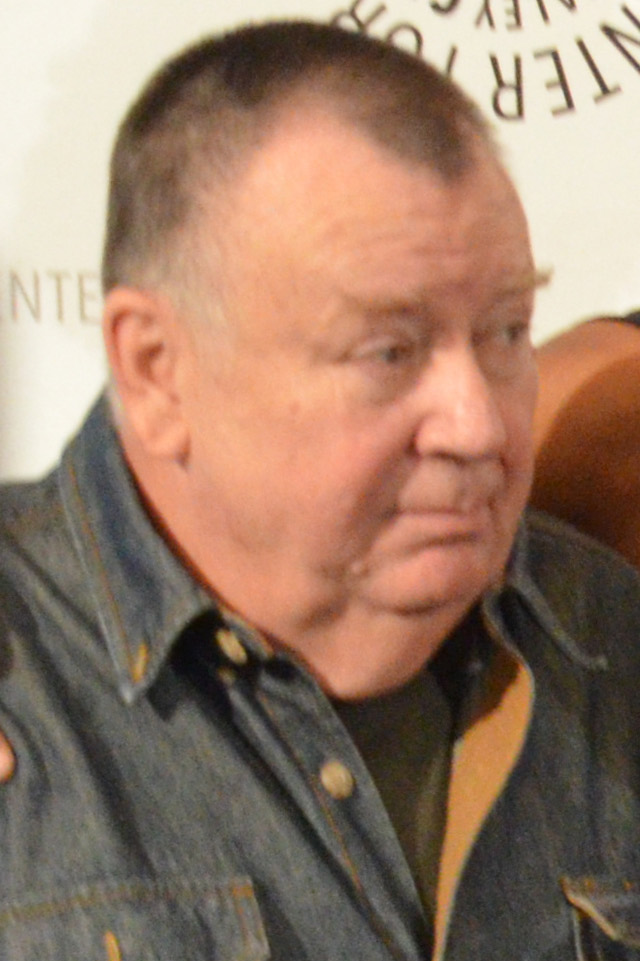
- Evans in 2013
- Born: February 16, 1948 (age 78); Missoula, Montana, U.S.
- Occupation: Actor
- Years active: 1981–present
- Spouse: Heather McLarty
- Military career
- Allegiance: United States of America
- Branch: United States Army
- Service years: 1968–1969

Troy Evans (born February 16, 1948) is an American actor who is perhaps best known for his role as Desk Clerk Francis "Frank" Martin in the television drama series ER, and more recently for his role as Detective II Johnson (Barrel) in Amazon's TV series Bosch. He has also appeared in Ace Ventura: Pet Detective, Under Siege, Teen Wolf, Kuffs, Fear and Loathing in Las Vegas, Black Dahlia, Demolition Man, The Frighteners, Tiger Cruise, View from the Top and Article 99 among others. He voiced Thistle Jinn in the 2013 animated adventure film Epic.

He served with the 25th Infantry Division during the Vietnam War, and was later cast as SFC Bob Pepper in the TV series China Beach, which was set during that war.

== Selected filmography ==
- Rhinestone (1984) – Rhinestone Heckler / Bettor
- Mama's Family (1984) – Local Announcer
- Teen Wolf (1985) – Dragon Basketball Coach
- Cheers S3 E17 (1985) – Cop
- Modern Girls (1986) – Club Owner
- Near Dark (1987) – Plainclothes Officer
- Planes, Trains and Automobiles (1987) – Antisocial Trucker (uncredited)
- Starman (TV series) (1987) – Desk Sergeant (Episode: The System)
- Shadows in the Storm (1988) – Det. Harris
- Deadly Dreams (1988) – Sheriff
- Martians Go Home (1989) – Cop
- Matlock (1989) – Dick Henderson (Episode: The Prisoner)
- Halloween 5: The Revenge of Michael Myers (1989) – Illinois State Police Trooper Charlie Bloch
- Pastime (1990) – Art
- Men at Work (1990) – Capt. Leo Dalton
- My Blue Heaven (1990) – Nicky
- Twin Peaks (1990) – Principal Wolchek
- Article 99 (1992) – Pat Travis
- Kuffs (1992) – Captain Morino
- The Lawnmower Man (1992) – Lt. Goodwin
- Love Field (1992) – Lt. Galvan
- Under Siege (1992) – Granger
- Demolition Man (1993) – James MacMillan the Tough Cop
- The Stand (1994) – Sheriff John Baker
- Ace Ventura: Pet Detective (1994) – Roger Podacter
- Father and Scout (1994) – Scoutmaster
- Murder, She Wrote (1994) – Harvey Hoffman
- Fudge (1995) – Bicycle Bob
- Boy Meets World (1996) – Ranger Mark
- Phenomenon (1996) – Roger
- The Frighteners (1996) – Sheriff Walt Perry
- Fear and Loathing in Las Vegas (1998) – Michigan Police Chief
- My Favorite Martian (1999) – Captain Dalton
- Reba (2001, season 1, episode 5) – Coach
- The Commission (2003) – Cecil J. McWatters
- Tiger Cruise (2004) – Chuck Horner
- Epic (2013) – Thistle Jinn (voice)
- The Book of Life (2014) – Old Man Hemmingway (voice)
- Bosch (2015–2021) – Detective Johnson (Barrel)
