= Kwongo Dak Padiet =

Chollo king of the Shiluk Kingdom

Reth Kwongo Dak Padiet I
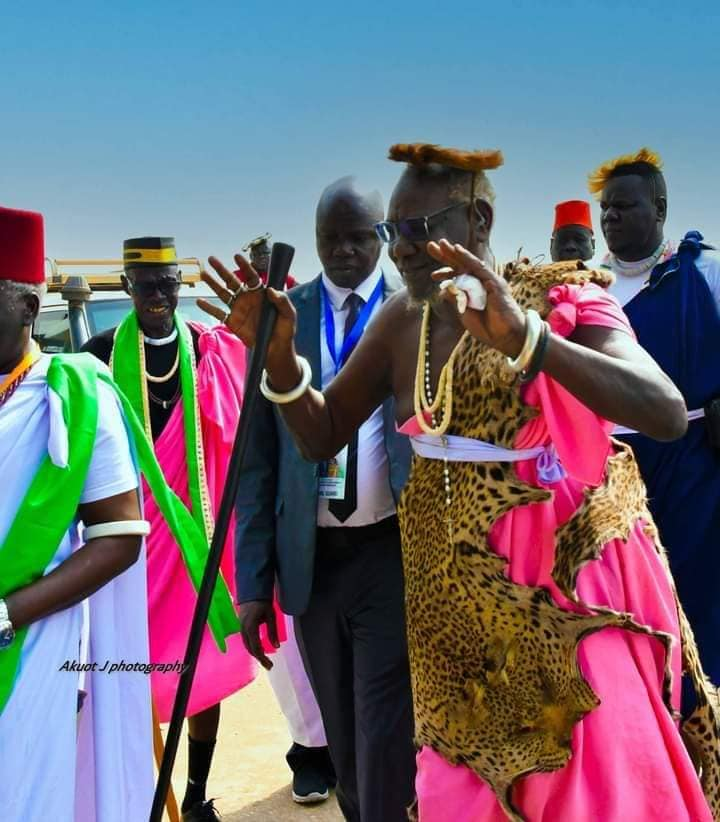
- Reth Kwongo Dak in 2023

Reth of the Shilluk Kingdom
- Reign: 1992–present
- Predecessor: Ayang Aney Kur
- Born: January 1, 1945 (age 81); Anglo-Egyptian Sudan (now South Sudan)

Reth Kwongo Dak Padiet I (born January 1, 1945) is the reigning Reth (also known as King) of the Shilluk Kingdom, He is the 35th King of Shilluk. Shilluk Kingdom was located along the left and right bank of the White Nile in what is now South Sudan and southern Sudan.

In 2022 Reth Kwongo Dak Padiet was airlifted to Juba by the South Sudanese government under the orders of President Salva Kiir when conflict broke out in the Upper Nile state.

== Installation as reth (king) ==
It was not until the death of Reth Ayang Aney Kur on June 1, 1992, that Reth Kwongo Dak Padiet was elected by the Jagi Pa Diwad (Chiefs) to succeed his father and become King. His coronation took place on April 27, 1993, during Sudan’s second civil war (1983–2005) one of the longest and bloodiest civil wars of South Sudan. However, knowing how important his coronation was to the Shilluk people the Sudanese People’s Liberation Army (SPLA) declared a demilitarized zone around the kingdom so that all ceremonies could take place peacefully.
