= Nyikang =

Nyikang was a semi-legendary founder of the Shilluk Kingdom, in the 16th century. He is a notion by which the Shilluk people apprehend a unity and coherence in the specifically Shilluk world.

== Etymology ==
The theonym Nyikango, pronounced Níkàŋō in the Shilluk language, more commonly appears in scholarly literature as Nyikang, pronounced Níkàŋ or Nàkàŋ, due to the frequent omission of the final ō. Variant spellings such as Nyakam, Nyekom, Nykawng, and Nyakang are considered outdated and are primarily found in the writings of early European observers from the late 19th and early 20th centuries. The standardized transcription Nyikang became firmly established after 1925, following the publication of Die Schilluk, the seminal monograph by Catholic missionary Wilhelm Hofmayr.

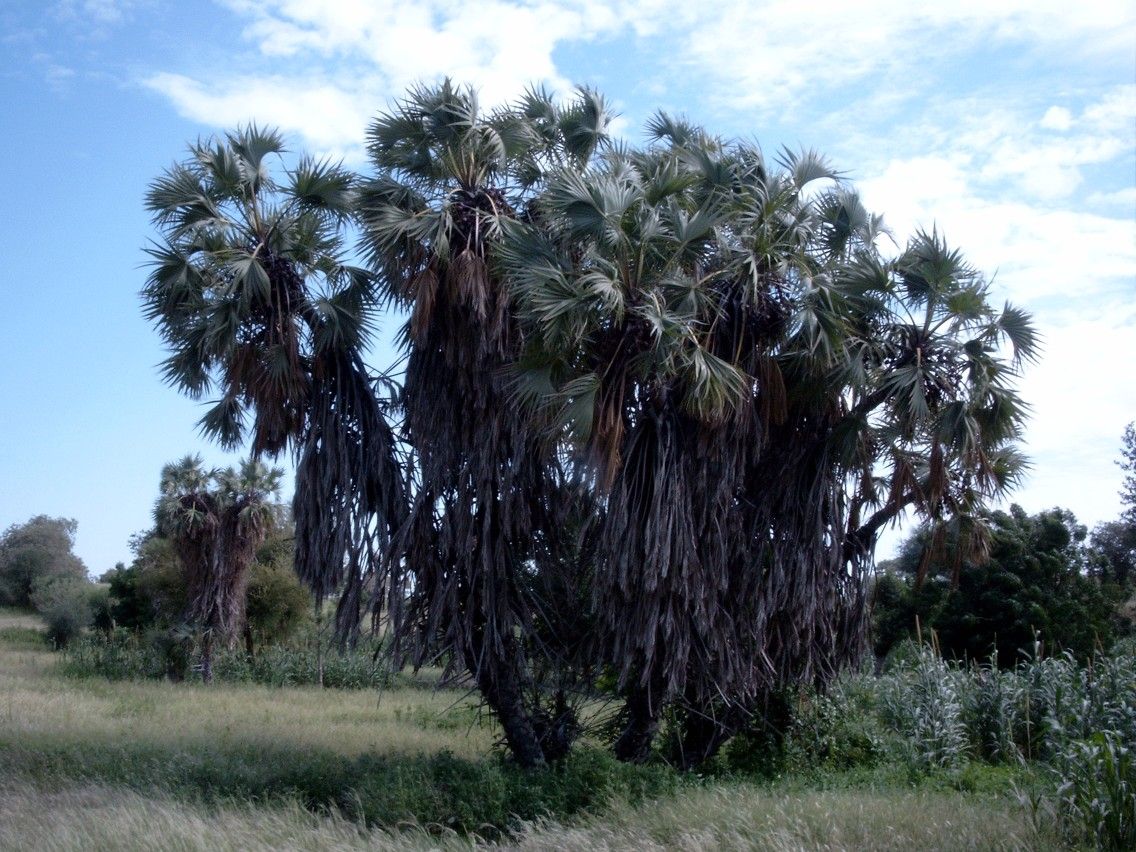
Nyikang or “the son of the doum palm”?

The name Nyikang is a compound formed from the prefix nyi (pronounced ní or na), meaning “son of,” and the root kang, which is likely a proper name—although no individual by this name appears in Shilluk oral tradition. Thus, Nyikang translates to “the son of Kang.” The Shilluk refer to themselves as Ocøllø in the singular and Cøllø in the plural, meaning “black people.” They call their homeland pothe Chol, “land of the Shilluk.” A secondary ethnonym, Okang, meaning “descendants of Kang,” further emphasizes their identity as the people of Nyikang, their national hero.

The word kango (pronounced kàŋō) has two distinct meanings in Shilluk: as a noun, it refers to the doum palm (Hyphaene thebaica), and as a verb, it means “to bring.” It remains uncertain whether the theonym Nyikang should be interpreted as “son of the doum palm” or “son of the one who brings” (presumably life or fertility). The doum palm is symbolically significant in Shilluk cosmology and is implicitly associated with the cosmic tree of primordial times in several tales. In one myth from the neighboring Anyuak people, for example, a rich and fertile land lies at the base of a towering palm tree 120 kilometers high, which connects the sky and the earth like a cosmic ladder.

== Epithets ==
Nyikang's many epithets recall his mythical origins as well as his supernatural power. His most common titles are Kwa (ancestor), wô (father), mal (sky) and pâlo (cloud). The names Oki (son of the Nile ) and Wad nam (son of the river) recall that he was attributed Nyikaya as his mother. The latter is a female spirit, a sort of African naiad, half-woman, half- crocodile who, according to popular belief, lives at the mouth of the Sobat River . The name Jal faluko (the man of Bahr el Ghazal ) recalls that Nyikang crossed this region before settling permanently in the Shilluk country. Agwokcang (dominator of the Sun) and Adalcang (owner of the Sun) recall the conflict between Nyikang and the Sun, the star having been defeated by being sprinkled with water. However, the name Atulecang (the one who makes the Sun rise) shows that Nyikang finally made peace with the sun. The name Kacedur (victor) shows that the character won his many battles against neighboring countries. Got a mal (the angry one) and Got a lany (the merciful one) indicate the ambivalence of the character who, depending on his mood, can refuse or accept the prayers of his subjects.

Hymn to Nyikang

Shilluk text Kwaye Nyikwèy, Agwogcang, Pa pega finy ! Wai wau wò ! Okio, Nyikango, Kwaye, ya tonge bòlo Durebang, ya kwaja yin Yeke kwaye, jal faluko, Bany dano angot ! Ayino. Nyikango, Agwogcang, Pa pega finy ! Adalcang, Atuole finy, atuole finy.	English adaptation O Ancestor Nyikwèy, Dominator of the Sun, Don't sit on the floor (help us)! The spears shout hurrah! O Son of the Nile, O Nyikang, O Ancestor, I turn to your face O Merciful One, I beg you O Ancestor, Man of Bahr el Ghazal, Lord of all peoples! He has gone far away. Nyikang, Dominator of the Sun, Don't sit on the floor! He whom the Sun cannot harm, He who is feared, he who is feared.

== Mythology ==
The Shilluk trace their ancestry through a mythic genealogy preserved through oral tradition. Though minor variations occur across regions and even among individual narrators, the essential structure remains stable. These traditions were recorded by D.S. Oyler in Nikawng and the Shilluk migration (1918), and provide insight into Shilluk cosmology and royal origins.

The genealogical sequence begins with a supernatural union and proceeds as follows:

Omaro, the son of a mysterious river cow and Nikia, the sister of the crocodile,

- was the father of Kolo,
- who was the father of Moel,
- who was the father of Okwa,
- who in turn was the father of Nyikang (also spelled Nikawng), the founding hero of the Shilluk people.

=== Departure from the land of Duwat ===
Nile river

Most Shilluk accounts indicate that Nyikang's migration took place in two successive stages: a first departure from the land of Duwat (his original homeland), followed by a second departure from Dimo, where he is said to have resided for a time. Oyler notes that the Shilluk regard this ancestral homeland as a distant, sacred land located “up the Nile,” often referred to as Duwot (or Duwat) or Kero. This mythic place is remembered as the “head of the earth,” a realm without death. Instead, the old and infirm would be left in the cattle yard, where they were trampled until reduced to the size of infants—after which they would begin life anew, perpetuating a cycle of rebirth and immortality.

Nyikang’s departure from this deathless land of Duwot marks the foundational moment in Shilluk history. According to one version of the narrative:

"When Okwa ceased to be king of the country, Nyikang was a candidate for the kingship. He was defeated by his half brother, Duwot. Being unwilling to give allegiance to his half brother, he left the country. The parting was dramatic. As he started to stalk off, Duwot called to him to look behind him. He merely turned his head, and Duwot threw a long sharpened stick after him. It is the same tool that the Shilluks still use for planting their crops, but it was the symbol of death. It was a warning to Nyikang that he was going to a land where death reigned. The sharpened stick was to be used in digging the graves of his dead. He accepted the stick in a defiant manner. He said: 'Some of my people will die, and those who remain will increase before they die.' One of his friends started to run after him to plead with him to remain, but Duwot warned him that he must choose between Duwot and Nyikang. As he seemed to hesitate, Nyikang called without looking back for him to go back to Duwot."

As Nyikang departed, he was joined by a number of loyal followers. Different traditions list his companions variously, but common names include his sons Bur and Shall; his father’s wife Ungwedo; three uncles—Moiny, Nyuado, and Juok; and three devoted servants—Ubogo, Ujul, and Mielo.

A similar but slightly different version is recorded by Diedrich Westermann (1912), who attributes the quarrel not only to a succession dispute but also to a disagreement over cattle. In this telling, Nyikang left with his brother Omgi, his half-brother Ju, and three sisters. As he departed, Duwat threw a digging stick after him—'to dig the gound (or to bury the dead)'. Along the journey, Nyikang gathered followers from various tribes. Eventually, he reached the mouth of the Sobat River, where he founded the Shilluk kingdom.

=== Departure from the land of Dim ===
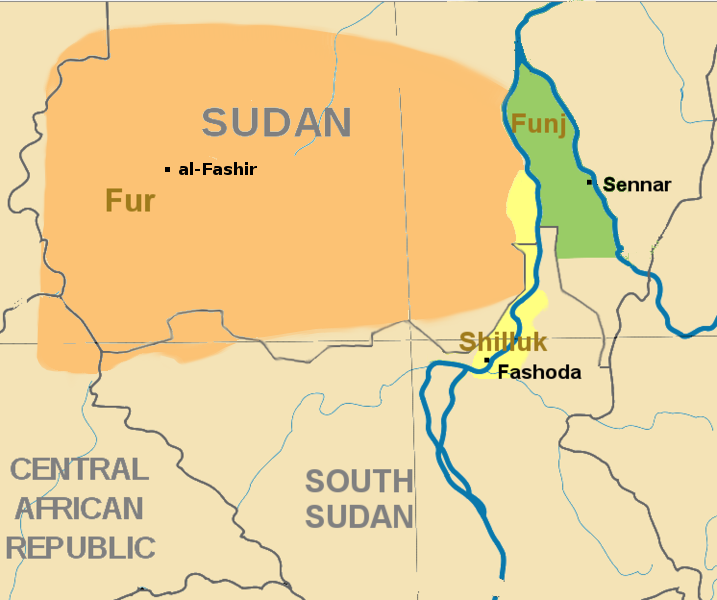
Southern Sudan - c.1800

According to Shilluk traditions recorded by Oyler (1918) and Diedrich (1912), the migration into their present homeland was preceded by a dramatic series of events in a foreign land called Tura. In Oyler’s version, Tura is ruled by a powerful sorcerer-king named Dim, whose conflict with Nyikang's son sparks the events of migration. In contrast, Diedrich presents the Dim not as a single ruler but as a people—a collective society with its own council and political will—among whom Nyikang temporarily settles.

In both accounts, the central ancestral figure, King Nyikang, plays a pivotal role. In Diedrich’s version, Nyikang and his twin brother Duwad were sons of Okwa, a descendant of Omara from heaven. After Okwa’s disappearance and the desertion of his village, the people were divided over who should succeed him—some favored Nyikang, others Duwad—leading to civil war and Nyikang’s departure. He journeyed south to the land of the Dim, where, as in Oyler’s account, he married a local woman who bore him a son named Dok (called Dak in Diedrich).

From childhood, Dok/Dak was unruly. Oyler recounts a fantastical episode in which a caretaker’s idle wish for Dok to grow up is instantly granted, transforming him into a powerful giant. Diedrich’s narrative, while less magical in tone, emphasizes Dak’s violent behavior—he begins killing members of the Dim community, prompting alarm. The Dim people, acting collectively, convene a council to plot Dak’s death. A man named Obogi (Ubogo in Oyler) attends the meeting but feigns deafness to avoid suspicion. Afterward, he warns Nyikang of the impending danger. To protect his son, Nyikang creates a wooden effigy, which the Dim mistake for Dak and attack. When the people later begin mourning Dak’s supposed death, he reappears during his own funeral dance, startling the community and solidifying his fearsome reputation.

Disillusioned by the mounting hostility in Tura, Nyikang and Ubogo resolved to leave. Ubogo, critical of the cowardice of the locals, insisted that only he, Dok, and Nyikang were fit to carry the burden of conflict. As they migrated, the group encountered the sudd—a massive swamp of interwoven grasses. Though they had boats, the dense vegetation blocked their passage. Ubogo proposed that a human sacrifice would part the waters. When Dok refused to offer one of his servants, Ubogo volunteered himself, saying he had eaten and his children were among the group. His self-sacrifice miraculously opened a way through the swamp.

The migrants eventually reached Kofal, a region along the Nile. Concerned about escalating tension between Dok and his half-brother Bur, Nyikang sent Bur away with Dok’s mother. Enraged, Dok pursued them but relented when he saw his mother cradling Bur. Still angry, he returned to confront Nyikang. Offered cattle and wives as compensation, Dok rejected them and instead demanded Nyikang’s daughter in marriage. This controversial union—between a son and his half-sister—was permitted and produced a child, laying the basis for the Shilluk royal tradition in which a newly crowned king may take a royal daughter as wife.

Following these mythic events, Nyikang’s group is understood to have entered the lands that became the Shilluk heartland.

=== Foundation of the Shilluk ===
According to Shilluk tradition, Nyikawng eventually arrived in what is now known as Shilluk country. At the time, the land was already inhabited, but Nyikawng was able to drive out the original occupants and claim the territory. However, the land he acquired was vast—too large for the small group that accompanied him from his earlier migrations. To secure and populate this territory, he incorporated new groups.

Some of these were conquered peoples who became subjects and assisted in holding the land, but Nyikawng did not rely solely on captives. According to the narrative, many beings that would not be recognized as people by the ordinary observer were identified by Nyikawng as humans in disguise. His ability to see through their masquerade allowed him to integrate them into his growing society.

Each group that was taken in under these circumstances became the origin of a subtribe within the Shilluk. While each of Nyikawng’s original companions from his homeland is remembered as the founder of a subtribe, these were few compared to the number of subtribes formed through local incorporation. At the time of recording, Shilluk tradition recognizes over seventy subtribes, a few of which are considered representative or typical.
