= Chris Oyler =

American author and AIDS activist

Christine Oyler is an American author, AIDS survivor, and activist.

The first three of Oyler's four sons were born with hemophilia. Her eldest son, Ben Oyler (June 28, 1977 - July 4, 1986) and her brother Scott (died July 5, 1987), who was also a hemophiliac, died of AIDS when they were transfused with clotting factor, vital for treating their condition, that was tainted. Ben was nine years old when he died, approximately 14 months after his AIDS diagnosis.

Ben Oyler was barred, like Ryan White, from attending classes at school although Oyler and her husband Grant declined to contest that ruling, preferring to preserve the family's privacy.

Oyler described the family's experience of her son's illness and death under the title Go Toward the Light, which was the basis for the 1988 made-for-television movie of the same name, with Linda Hamilton as a similarly situated mother. The book also includes how her faith as a Mormon helped her through this time.

== See also ==
- Contaminated haemophilia blood products
