= Hoyt Hilsman =

American author, journalist and political figure

Hoyt R. Hilsman is an author, journalist and political figure. He has written novels, non-fiction books, plays and screenplays, and is a regular contributor to national media. He was a candidate for Congress in California in 2006 and 2008, and has been a delegate to the national and state Democratic conventions. He has been a director at the Hope Street Group, a bipartisan think tank whose members are committed to the equality of opportunity and economic growth. He was elected in 2015 to the Board of Trustees of Pasadena City College, defeating an incumbent by nearly a 2-1 margin. He is currently Chair of the United Democratic Headquarters, a coalition of Democratic clubs and progressive organizations in California. He is also on the board of directors of the Pasadena City College Foundation and Parson's Nose Theater.

== Early life and education ==
Hoyt Hilsman was raised in Washington, D.C., where his father, Roger Hilsman, served as Assistant Secretary of State in the administration of President Kennedy. Hilsman followed his father to New York City, where he became a professor of political science at Columbia University. He graduated from Columbia College in 1970 and then went on to graduate from Columbia Law School. After finishing law school, Hilsman began working at the Federal Legal Services Program with the poor, unemployed and disabled at a state prison, and later as an executive at the Screen Actors Guild.

== Career ==
He began his writing career in New York as a playwright and journalist, and later moved to Los Angeles where he wrote screenplays for studios and television networks, including New Line, Disney, Sony, CBS and ABC. His original television pilot, Foggy Bottom, based on his childhood in Washington, was honored at the Slamdance Film Festival. His plays have been produced in the US and abroad and have won numerous awards.

He has been a regular theater and television critic for Daily Variety and a regular contributor to national newspapers and magazines, including The New York Times, the Los Angeles Times, the Huffington Post, Variety, Backstage, and Los Angeles. He has written a series of political thrillers, including Nineteen Angels, which is set in the Middle East and is in development as a feature film., The Chaklala Codes and Back Channel He has also been active as an independent producer in film, television and internet, including the films Beneath the Eyes of God, Snow Without Name, and the internet series Deadly Embrace. He was a producer at z.com, an internet startup founded by Disney executives, along with Brad Grey, Oliver Stone and others.

He is a member and former President of the Los Angeles Drama Critics Circle and a member of the advisory board of Marymount California University. He has taught screenwriting and journalism at UCLA and Pasadena City College and is founder of the Pasadena Writers Workshop. From 2011 to 2018, he was a regular contributor to The Huffington Post.

== Personal life ==
Hilsman is married to the painter Nancy Kay Turner. They have one son.
