= Monica Beltran =

American soldier (born 1985)

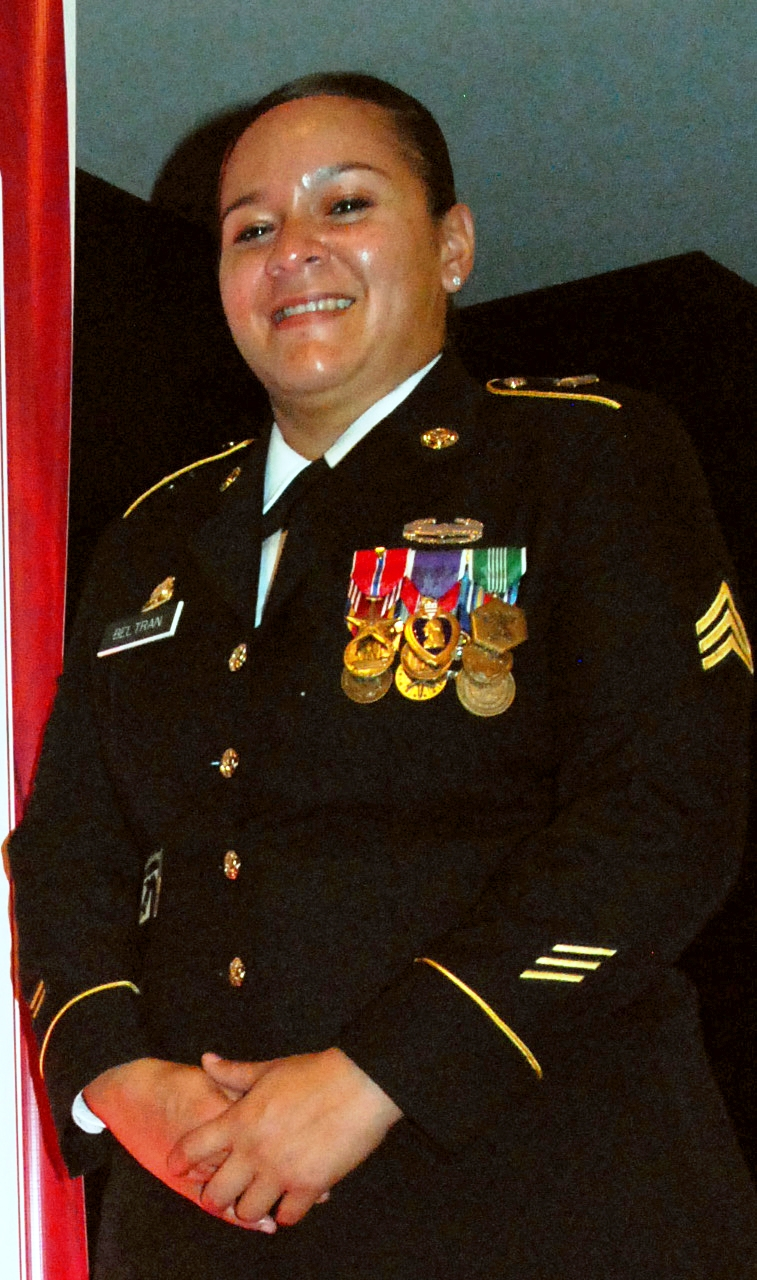
- Beltran in 2012
- Born: 1985 (age 40–41)
- Military career
- Allegiance: United States
- Branch: Virginia Army National Guard
- Service years: 2003–2023
- Rank: Staff sergeant
- Unit: 1173rd Transportation Company (2005)
- Conflicts: Iraq War (WIA); War in Afghanistan
- Awards: Combat Action Badge; Bronze Star Medal with "V" device; Purple Heart; Army Commendation Medal; Army Good Conduct Medal; National Defense Service Medal; GWOT Expeditionary Medal; Global War on Terrorism Service Medal; Armed Forces Reserve Medal; NCO Professional Development Ribbon; Army Service Ribbon; Army Overseas Service Ribbon; Virginia Governor's National Service Medal
- Other work: Dispatcher for Lockheed Martin (2006)

Monica Beltran (born 1985) is a retired soldier of the Virginia Army National Guard who was awarded the Bronze Star Medal with "V" device for actions during a 2005 battle in the Iraq War.

== Early life and education ==
Born in 1985, Beltran is from Prince William County, Virginia. Her mother is Luz Washington. Beltran lived in the Elizabeth, New Jersey area before moving to Northern Virginia, where she graduated from Gar-Field Senior High School.

== Career ==
As a teenager in February 2003, Beltran enlisted in the Virginia Army National Guard, primarily for the supplementary tuition assistance.

In late October 2005, Beltran was in Iraq as part of the 1173rd Transportation Company. She had been in Iraq for over 10 months by that point and was nearing the end of their mission; her unit's primary duty was providing armed escort for convoys of military vehicles in the country. While heading to a nearby forward operating base (for the first time) on October 26, 2005, Beltran and several other soldiers from her unit were ambushed by enemy forces using hand grenades, small arms fire, and rocket-propelled grenades. Ranked private first class at the time, she helped fight off the attack as a vehicle turret gunner, providing suppressing fire with a .50 caliber machine gun, despite suffering (unbeknownst to Beltran at the time) a bullet wound to her left hand in the process. Beltran's vehicle was hit by enemy fire, including rocket-propelled grenades, injuring the driver. Fellow soldier James Witkowski, one of Beltran's friends, was killed in the ambush, and 5 other soldiers were injured. Beltran's actions helped save 54 other soldiers from suffering serious injury. As a result of continuing to fight against the enemy even while injured, Beltran was awarded the Bronze Star Medal with "V" device, along with a Purple Heart (for her injury), and promoted to specialist. Several other soldiers also received Bronze Star Medals for valor; the soldier who was killed posthumously received a Silver Star. The entire battle lasted approximately 30 minutes. In October 2006, Beltran was promoted to sergeant.

In 2006, Beltran also worked for Lockheed Martin as a dispatcher. She served with the XVIII Airborne Corps and was deployed to Afghanistan in 2013.

Beltran retired from the Army National Guard in August 2023.

== Personal life ==
In 2006, Beltran lived in Lorton, Virginia. She has a younger sister who was in kindergarten in 2006. In 2012, Beltran was given the Virginia Women in History award by the Library of Virginia.

== Awards and decorations ==
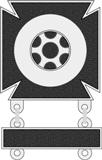
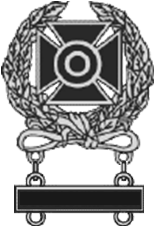

Badge	Combat Action Badge		
1st row	Bronze Star Medal with "V" device		
2nd row	Army Reserve Components Achievement Medal	Purple Heart	Army Commendation Medal with 4 oak leaf clusters
3rd row	Army Good Conduct Medal	National Defense Service Medal	Afghanistan Campaign Medal with two campaign stars
4th row	Iraq Campaign Medal with one campaign star	Global War on Terrorism Expeditionary Medal	Global War on Terrorism Service Medal
5th row	Armed Forces Reserve Medal with "M" device	Non-Commissioned Officer Professional Development Ribbon	Army Service Ribbon
6th row	Army Overseas Service Ribbon with 2 numeral	NATO Medal	Virginia Governor's National Service Medal
Badges	Driver and Mechanic Badge	Marksmanship Badge with rifle bar	

== See also ==
- Monica Lin Brown
- Leigh Ann Hester
