= General Kerr =

General Kerr may refer to:

- Clayton P. Kerr (1900–1977), U.S. Army major general
- James Taggart Kerr (1859–1949), U.S. Army brigadier general
- John Brown Kerr (1847–1928), U.S. Army brigadier general
- Joseph Kerr (1765–1837), Ohio Volunteers brigadier general
- Lord Mark Kerr (British Army officer, born 1676) (1676–1752), British Army general
- Lord Mark Kerr (British Army officer, born 1817) (1817–1900), British Army general
- Mark Kerr (Royal Navy officer, born 1864) (1864–1944), Royal Air Force major general
- Seumas Kerr (born 1953), British Army major general
- William Kerr (British Army general) (died 1741), British Army lieutenant general
- William Kerr, 2nd Marquess of Lothian (1661–1722), Scottish Dragoons lieutenant general
- William Kerr, 4th Marquess of Lothian (1710–1775), Scottish Dragoons general
- William Kerr, 5th Marquess of Lothian (1737–1815). British Army general

== See also ==
- Attorney General Kerr (disambiguation)
