= 4th Brigade Combat Team, 82nd Airborne Division =

Inactive brigade of the US Army

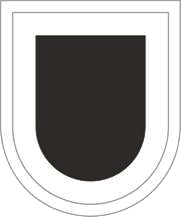
Beret flash of the 4th Brigade Combat Team, 82nd Airborne Division

The 4th Brigade Combat Team, 82nd Airborne Division is an inactive Airborne Brigade of the United States Army. The brigade was active from 1968-1969, and from 2006-2014. The brigade conducted three rotations to Afghanistan, in 2007 and 2008, 2009 and 2010, and 2012. The brigade's two infantry battalions deployed for a fourth time in 2013-2014, and became part of other BCTs in the division upon their redeployment.

== History ==
=== Vietnam ===
The 4th Brigade Combat Team, 82nd Airborne Division of the US Army was initially activated in July 1968, to fill in for the 3rd Brigade which had deployed to Vietnam. The brigade consisted of a Headquarters and Headquarters Company and three infantry battalions: 4th Battalion (Airborne), 325th Infantry Regiment; 3rd Battalion (Airborne), 504th Infantry Regiment; and 3rd Battalion (Airborne), 505th Infantry Regiment. The brigade never deployed, and was inactivated in December 1969, following the return of the 3rd Brigade from Vietnam.

=== Afghanistan ===
As part of the US Army's transformation to a modular force, the brigade was reactivated in 2006 as an airborne Infantry Brigade Combat Team. The 4th BCT consisted of:

- Headquarters and Headquarters Company
- 4th Squadron, 73rd Cavalry Regiment
- 1st Battalion, 508th Parachute Infantry Regiment
- 2nd Battalion, 508th Parachute Infantry Regiment
- 2nd Battalion, 321st Airborne Field Artillery Regiment
- Special Troops Battalion, 4th Brigade Combat Team
- 782nd Brigade Support Battalion

==== First Deployment ====
The brigade's first deployment was to multinational Regional Command East in Afghanistan, from January 2007 through March 2008. The brigade conducted counter-insurgency operations in RC East, and provided an infantry battalion as the theater reserve force. During that deployment, SPC Monica Brown became the second woman since World War II to earn the Silver Star for gallantly saving the lives of fellows soldiers during an ambush in Paktika Province on April 25, 2007.

==== Ambushing the Taliban ====
In August 2007, in an effort to develop commerce and ultimately pave the road to hopefully expand commerce, team Charlie of the 4-73rd cavalry squadron, 4th BCT, 82nd Airborne was sent to an AO with the task of interdicting and clearing it to allow the expansion of the Afghan development zones in Khowst and Gardez. The brigade set a Forward Operating Base called Wilderness. Charlie company of the Brigade occupied Wilderness. In October 2007, Taliban IDF(indirect fire) of mortar and rocket attacks began to increase against the base. S-2 analysts observed that the most intense attacks occurred between 0900 and 1000 on Wednesdays, after paydays, leading the Brigade to conclude the people that they were paying to work on local road projects were actually insurgents buying the rockets with that money. By November 2007, the Americans had a pretty good notion as to the points of origin of the fire and came up with a plan to eliminate the IDF team.

Six personal from the Brigade were sent to ambush and eliminate the IDF team. The six man American team included two snipers armed with sound suppressed sniper rifles, a spotter with an M4 with m203, one member to control indirect fires with their artillery support, one soldier armed with an M14, and another soldier armed with a M249. The brigade also did not send in any air asset into the airspace so as not to scare away the enemy since the audible and visual signature of any aircraft would discourage the enemy fire team from conducting its mission. At November 11, 2007, the six man team inserted by blacked-out humvees to within about 7 kilometers of the planned engagement area in the dark. The U.S. team climbed up to the position which was a rocky outcrop near the top of a small mountain connected to the rear by several larger mountains. The team split into two 3-man elements. The position provided excellent observation into the kill zone.

The U.S. airborne soldiers improved their position by concealing their locations by low and high crawl due to the lack of vegetation for concealment. The U.S. team spent the next two-and-a-half days either crawling to relieve themselves a few meters away or alternating between the prone position, lying on their sides, or laying on their backs. After two days of observation. Three Taliban insurgents carrying AK-47 style assault rifles came into the kill zone. The Americans successfully initiated their ambush on the Taliban insurgents. The Americans engaged the Taliban IDF element with sound suppressed sniper rifles, M249 machine gun, and indirect artillery fire. The American ambush killed all three insurgents. The enemy now knew they were no longer safe in their own support zone.

==== Combat advising the Afghan Army ====
In August 2009, the brigade returned to Afghanistan, operating throughout southern and western Afghanistan, conducted "combat advising" for Afghan Army and police forces.

==== 2012 Deployments ====
In February 2012, the 508th PIR deployed to Afghanistan for a third time to Kandahar Province, the birthplace and stronghold of the Taliban, to combat the core of Afghan insurgency and help Afghan security forces gain a stronghold in the territory as part of Operation Righteous Endeavor. The brigade redeployed in September 2012.

==== Redeployment ====
Although the brigade would not deploy again, both infantry battalions deployed in late 2013 and early 2014, assuming the theater reserve force mission for the NATO-led International Security Assistance Force in Afghanistan. While the battalions were deployed, the brigade was inactivated. The battalions joined other BCTs at Fort Bragg upon their redeployment in 2014.

== Lineage and honors ==
=== Lineage ===
- Constituted 3 July 1968 in the Regular Army as Headquarters and Headquarters Company, 4th Brigade, 82d Airborne Division
- Activated 15 July 1968 at Fort Bragg, North Carolina
- Inactivated 15 December 1969 at Fort Bragg, North Carolina
- Headquarters, 4th Brigade, 82d Airborne Division, redesignated 16 June 2006 as Headquarters, 4th Brigade Combat Team, 82d Airborne Division, and activated at Fort Bragg, North Carolina (Headquarters Company, 4th Brigade, 82d Airborne Division - hereafter separate lineage)

=== Campaign participation credit ===
- War on terrorism: Campaigns to be determined
  - Afghanistan: Consolidation II, Consolidation III; Transition I

Note: The published US Army lineage lists no War on Terrorism campaigns, as of 21 June 2006. Comparison of the battalion's deployment dates with War on Terrorism campaigns estimates that the battalion is entitled to credit for participation in the 3 campaigns listed.

=== Decorations ===
- Meritorious Unit Commendation for the period 21 February 2007 through 21 April 2008
- Meritorious Unit Commendation for the period 21 August 2009 through 20 August 2010
- Valorous Unit Award for the period 15 March 2012 through 7 September 2012.

== Notable soldiers ==
NATO Map Symbol

4

82 Abn

- Monica Lin Brown (born 1988), sergeant and medic; first woman during the War in Afghanistan to receive the Silver Star
