= List of Australian Silver Star recipients =

The Silver Star is the third-highest military decoration that can be awarded by the United States. It is awarded for gallantry in action against an enemy of the United States and may be awarded to any person who, while serving in any capacity with the armed forces, distinguishes himself or herself by extraordinary heroism.

The Silver Star is the successor decoration to the Citation Star which was established by an Act of the United States Congress on 9 July 1918. On 19 July 1932, the United States Secretary of War approved the Silver Star to replace the Citation Star.

== Recipients ==
This along with the * indicates that the Silver Star was awarded posthumously

Name	Date of action	Conflict	Unit	Place of action	Notes
Frank Bladin	1942	WWII	Royal Australian Air Force	Kendari Dutch East Indies	
Leslie Allen	1943	World War II	2/5th Battalion	Mount Tambu, New Guinea	
John Sims Archer	1942	World War II	No. 4 Squadron RAAF	Gona, Papua	
Peter Badcoe	1967*	Vietnam War	Australian Army Training Team Vietnam	An Thuan, Vietnam	
Peter Badcoe	1967*	Vietnam War	Australian Army Training Team Vietnam	Mong Ha, Vietnam	Oak Leaf Cluster (second award)
David Butler	1951	Korean War	3rd Battalion, Royal Australian Regiment	Yongju, North Korea	
Major General Geoff Carter AO DSM	1972	Vietnam War	Australian Army Training Team Vietnam (AATTV)	South Vietnam	
Garry G. Cooper	1968	Vietnam War	Royal Australian Air Force	Saigon, Vietnam	Attached to 19th Tactical Air Support Squadron, United States Air Force
Charles Green	1951*	Korean War	3rd Battalion, Royal Australian Regiment		
Harry Harcourt	1942	World War II	2/6th Independent Company	Buna, Papua	
Elton Murray Ifould	1942	World War II	No. 4 Squadron RAAF	Papua	
Edward Thompson Mobsby	1942*	World War II	Royal Australian Air Force	Papua	
John Ronald Mowbray	1942	World War II	No. 4 Squadron RAAF	Buna, Papua	
Harold Edward Patch	1953	Korean War	Australian Army		
Keith Payne	1969	Vietnam War	Australian Army Training Team Vietnam		
Andrew Perry	1970	Vietnam War	RAN Helicopter Flight – Vietnam	Binh Dai, Vietnam	
John G. Pettit	1970*	Vietnam War	Australian Army	Dak Seang, Vietnam	
David Rowley Sinclair	1942	World War II	435th Bomb Squadron, 9th Bomb Group, US Air Force	Rabaul, New Guinea	
John Henry Stafford	1951	Korean War	3rd Battalion, Royal Australian Regiment		
Jeffrey Jones	1950	Korean War	3rd Battalion, Royal Australian Regiment	Pakchon	
Kevin Wheatley	1965*	Vietnam War	Australian Army Training Team Vietnam		
Macaulay Cottrell	1968	Vietnam War	Royal Australian Air Force		
Darval Lyell Sly	1944	World War II	Australian Military Forces		AMF 21/A-Z 17
