= Bull Allen =

Bull Allen may refer to:

- Leslie "Bull" Allen (1916–1982), Australian soldier, recipient of the United States’ Silver Star
- Mark "Bull" Allen (born 1967), New Zealand rugby player and celebrity
