= Jane St. John =

Jane St. John may refer to:

- Jane Martha St. John (1801-1882), English photographer
- Jane I. Rignel St. John (1884-1977), American army nurse
