= Michael G. Stahl =

American army officer

Michael Stahl
- Born: Michael Gerard Stahl; January 28, 1945; Buffalo, New York, U.S.
- Occupation: US Army Special Forces soldier
- Known for: Vietnam

Michael Gerard Stahl is a medically retired US Army Special Forces soldier. A highly decorated combat veteran with 24 months in Vietnam, Stahl was the Intel Sgt for A-102 at Tien Phuoc Special Forces Camp and later spent time in covert reconnaissance with the top secret unit known as Military Assistance Command, Vietnam - Studies and Observations Group. It is here he served as the 1-0 (Team Leader) for RT Michigan out of CCN (Command and Control North). He was seriously wounded on August 8, 1970, and medevac'd to the continental US.

== Early life ==
Michael Gerard Stahl was born on January 28, 1945, in Millard Fillmore Hospital in Buffalo, NY. In 1947, part of his family moved to Florida and settled in Bradenton. Michael attended Ballard Elementary School, Walker Junior High School and Manatee High School. He became very involved in music as a percussionist and, in his junior year, was a member of the high school marching and symphonic bands, the high school orchestra, the Manatee County Community Band, and The Junior West Coast Philharmonic. In addition, he learned to play trumpet, played in the pit orchestra for the senior class play and played the male lead in the junior class play.

== Military career ==
Michael Stahl enlisted in the US Army on November 22, 1962, at the age of 17 in response to the Cuban Missile Crisis. Stahl was initially trained as a Parachute rigger and Arabic language translator/interpreter before being selected for US Special Forces Training.

=== First tour in Vietnam ===
In August 1967 then E-5 Stahl was assigned to A-102, radio callsign "Tricky Misfit", at Tien Phuoc Special Forces Camp. Stahl started his deployment out as the Intel. Sgt. After promotion to E-6 Stahl was reassigned to the position of Civil Affairs/Psy-Ops NCO (S5). At this time Stahl reported to CA/Psy-Ops Officer, LT Scally.

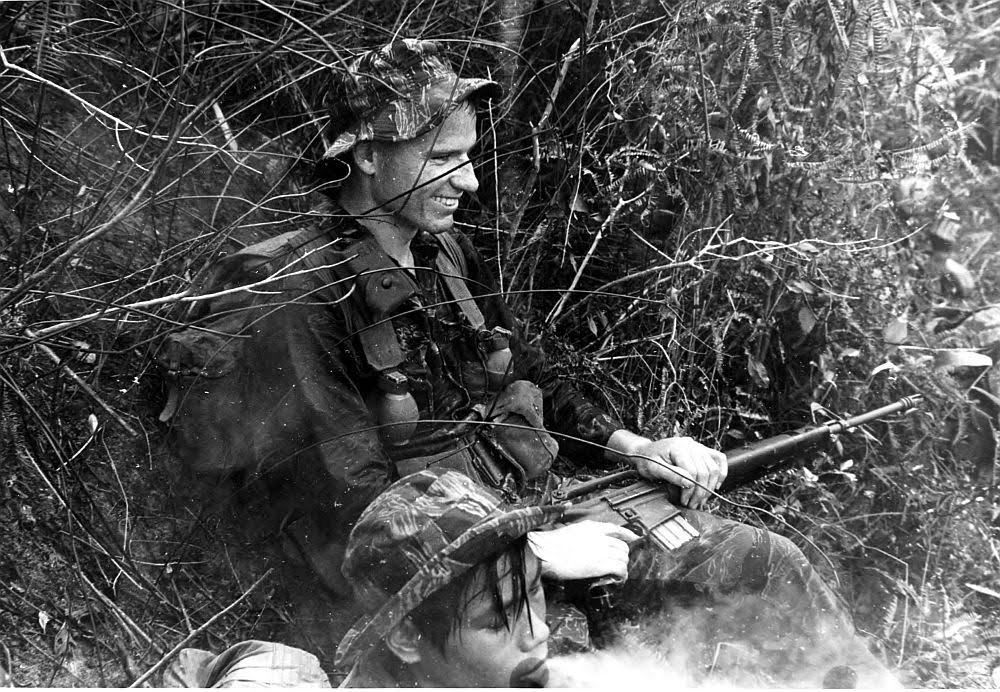
Mike Stahl in the field

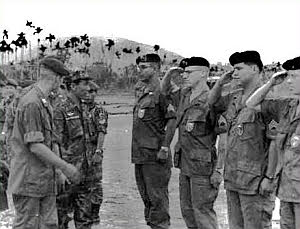
Mike Stahl (third from right) during the awarding of the Vietnam Cross of Gallantry with other recipients.

Stahl's first contact with the enemy occurred on 23 December 1967. While returning from several days in the field with a company of Civilian Irregular Defense Group (CIDG) soldiers, the patrol's point squad walked into a previously unknown headquarters area of an NVA battalion moving through the area. The point squad came under unexpected and extremely accurate enemy automatic weapons fire—killing one soldier and wounding two. Stahl single-handedly assaulted the enemy position and eliminated the occupant with rifle fire. Immediately following this, another heavy burst of enemy fire swept the lead element of the assaulting CIDG company, seriously wounding one of the Vietnamese troops. Stahl rushed to the wounded soldier and carried him to a safe position and began to treat his wounds. SSG (E-6) Stahl then directed his element's assault on the enemy position, routing them from the area. For this action, Stahl was awarded his first of two Silver Stars. Following this assault, the patrol collected a large number of enemy documents and maps, foretelling the Tet Offensive attack on Tam Key.

=== Second tour in Vietnam ===
Stahl returned to Vietnam in August 1969 and again requested assignment to CCN (Command and Control North). Stahl was assigned as the Intelligence Sergeant at Mobile Launch Team 2 (MLT-2) at Quang Tri until February 1970, when he was reassigned to the CCN TOC (Tactical Operations Center) at Marble Mountain. After requesting transfer to the Recon Company at CCN multiple times including on his first tour, newly promoted SFC Stahl was assigned to the Recon Company. Stahl was assigned as the 1-1 (Asst. Team Leader) of "RT Michigan". After his first mission with RT Michigan the 1-0's (Team Leader) tour ended and he returned to the US. Stahl attended the MAC V SOG 1-0 school in Long Thanh and became the new 1-0 of RT Michigan. Stahl completed several missions with RT Michigan and was seriously wounded in Laos on August 8, 1970. The actions on the ground that day resulted in Stahl's second Silver Star.

=== Air America ===
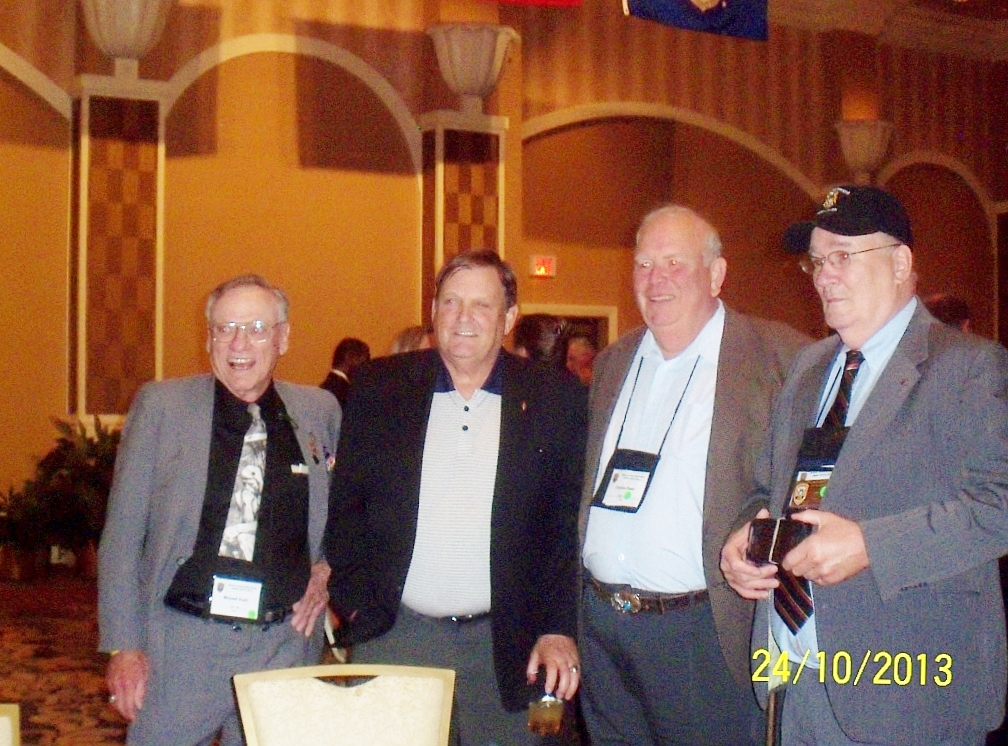
SFC Mike Stahl (left) with some fellow RT Michigan men. 1-0 MG Eldon Bargewell (Ret.) Stahl's 1-1 MAJ Charlie Reed (Ret.) 1-0 LT James Wiesbrod

Throughout his first tour, Stahl had many occasions to work with Air America aircraft to fulfill various duties while assigned to "C" Company in Da Nang. During the period of time Stahl was working as the C-Team's CA (Civil Affairs) NCO, Thuong Duc Camp once again came under siege by the enemy. The camp's defenders were running low on food, while Stahl's location had a surplus. Due to anti aircraft fire, the Air Force declined to fly the mission. Using topographical maps and his training and experience as a Parachute Rigger, Stahl orchestrated the only known combat freefall supply drop. From an Air America DHC-4 Caribou Stahl air dropped five one-thousand pound pallets of rice to the besieged camp.

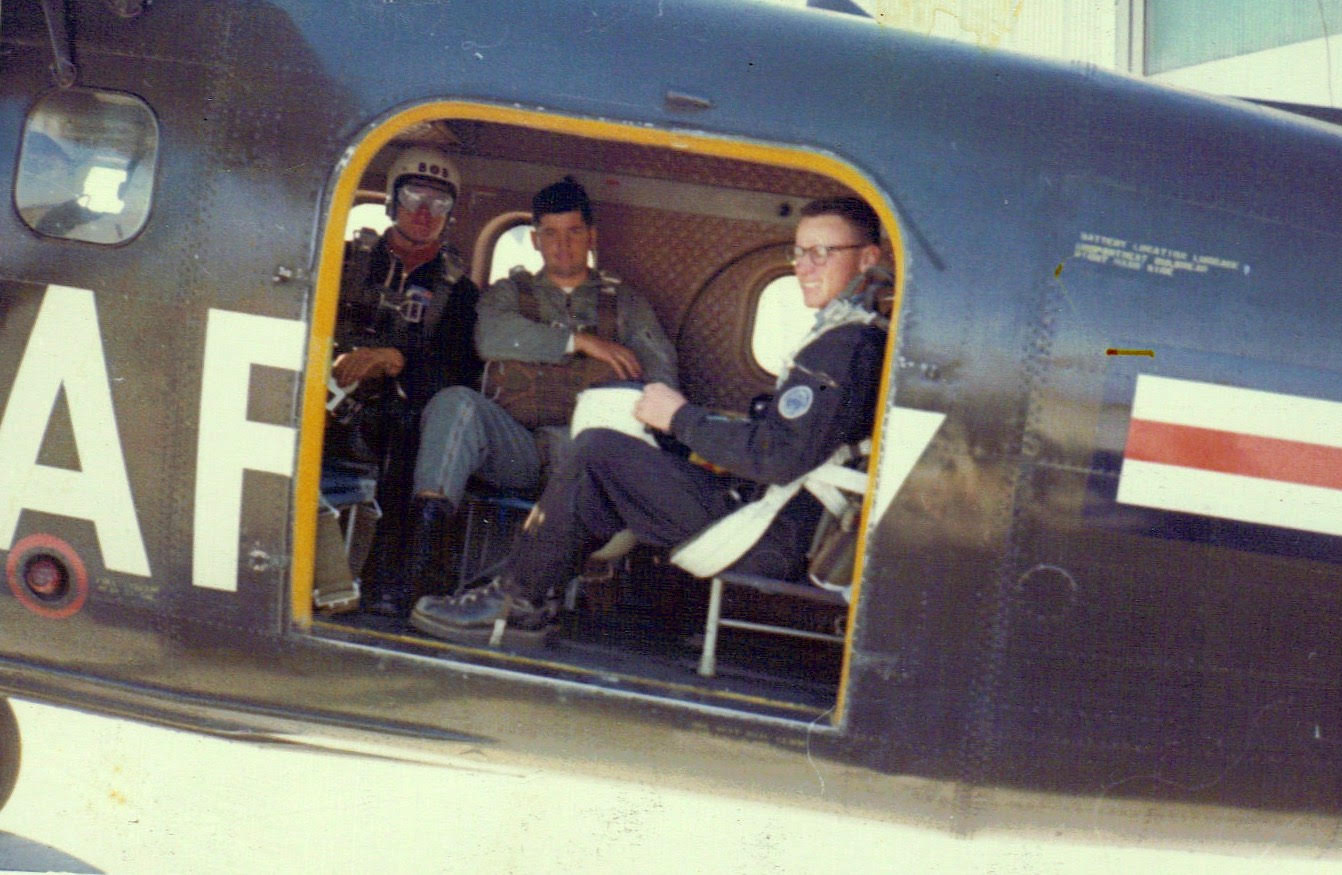
Stahl (right) jump-mastering a load in a U1-A Otter. Pictured with his homemade harness, and (hidden) modified "rag-rig"

== Education ==
Manatee Jr. College May 73 with AA, Magna Cum Laude

- Phi Theta Kappa (International College Honor Society),
- Who's Who Among Students in American Junior Colleges
- Certificate of Merit presented by Phi Beta Lambda (Future Business Leaders of America)
- Charter member and president of MJC's chapter of Phi Rho Pi, (National Forensic Association for Two Year Colleges). Participated in intercollegiate debate.
- Appointed to MJC's prestigious Committee of 20 (selected though academic achievement, service to the school and recommendations of professors.)

University of Southern Colorado Dec 80 with Special Distinction with a BS in Behavioral Science.

University of Northern Colorado Dec 81 with an MA in Human Communication.

== Personal life ==
From the mid-80's through the mid-90's, Stahl worked extensively on his PTSD symptoms through the Colorado Springs Veteran Center. He is also a graduate of the inpatient PTSD program at the VAMC in Denver. He currently dedicates much of his free time to helping other Combat Veterans through support groups and outreach work.

=== Skydiving ===
Stahl had long wanted to learn to sky dive since the early 60's TV series Ripcord. He made his first sport jump in March 1964. Skydiving every chance he had from that point on, SFC Stahl became a pioneer in the early days of sport parachuting. He frequently made his own harnesses and modified parachutes with his own experimental ideas and homemade equipment. During his first tour in Vietnam he made three recreational skydives with Eugene Hasenfus from an Air America DHC-4, Caribou over Special Forces A camps: Tra Bong from 8500 feet AGL; Gia Vuc from 15,500 feet AGL; Ha Thanh from 10,500 feet AGL. He holds USPA (United States Parachute Association) licenses A716 (Novice), B4223 (Parachutist), C3346 (Jumpmaster) and D2228 (Expert); APF (Australian Parachute Federation) B471; FAA (Federal Aviation Administration) Senior Rigger Certificate 1644223.

== Awards and decorations ==
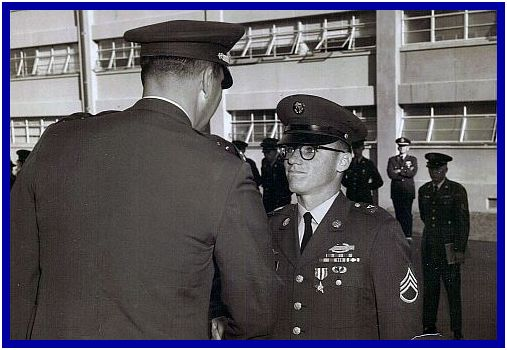
Mike Stahl receiving first Silver Star while at German Language School

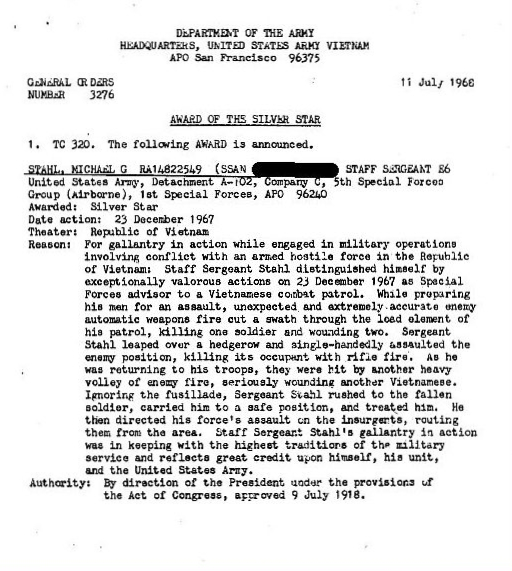
First Silver Star citation

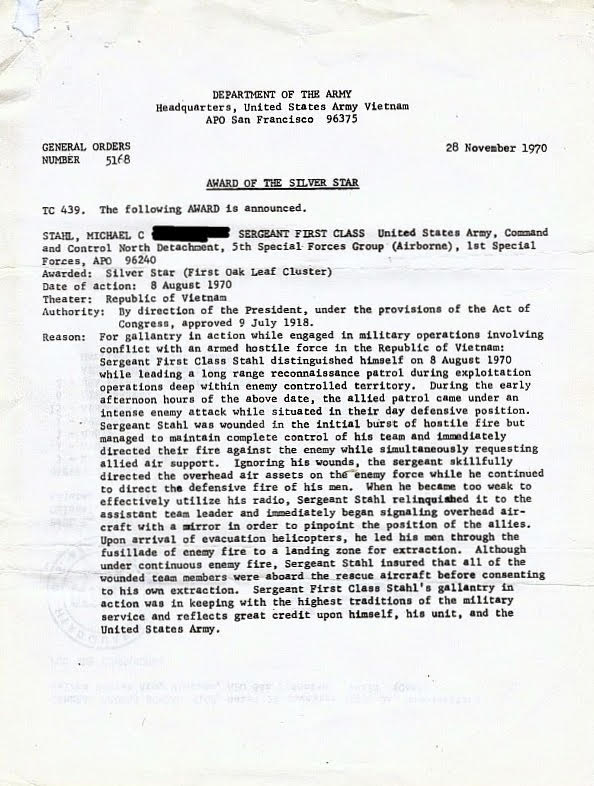
Second Silver Star citation

- Silver Star with oak leaf cluster
- Bronze Star with oak leaf cluster
- Purple Heart
- Air Medal
- Good Conduct Medal with two knots
- National Defense Service Medal
- Vietnam Service Medal with eight campaign stars
- Vietnamese Cross of Gallantry with bronze star (personal award)
- Vietnam Campaign Medal
- Vietnamese Special Forces Jump Wings
- Parachutist Badge
- Presidential Unit Citation
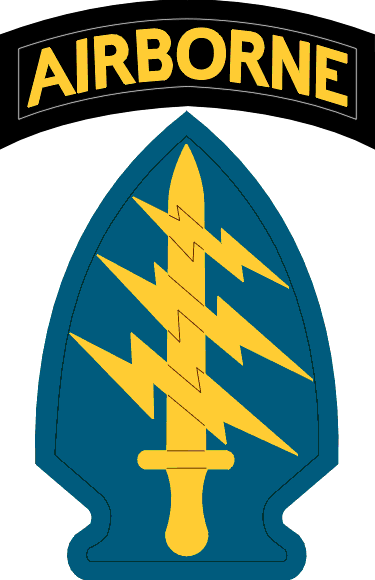

Resources
