= Attorney General Kerr =

Attorney General Kerr may refer to:

- Ewing Thomas Kerr (1900–1992), Attorney General of Wyoming
- Duncan Kerr (born 1952), Attorney-General of Australia

== See also ==
- General Kerr (disambiguation)
