= Monica Lin Brown =

American combat medic (born 1988)

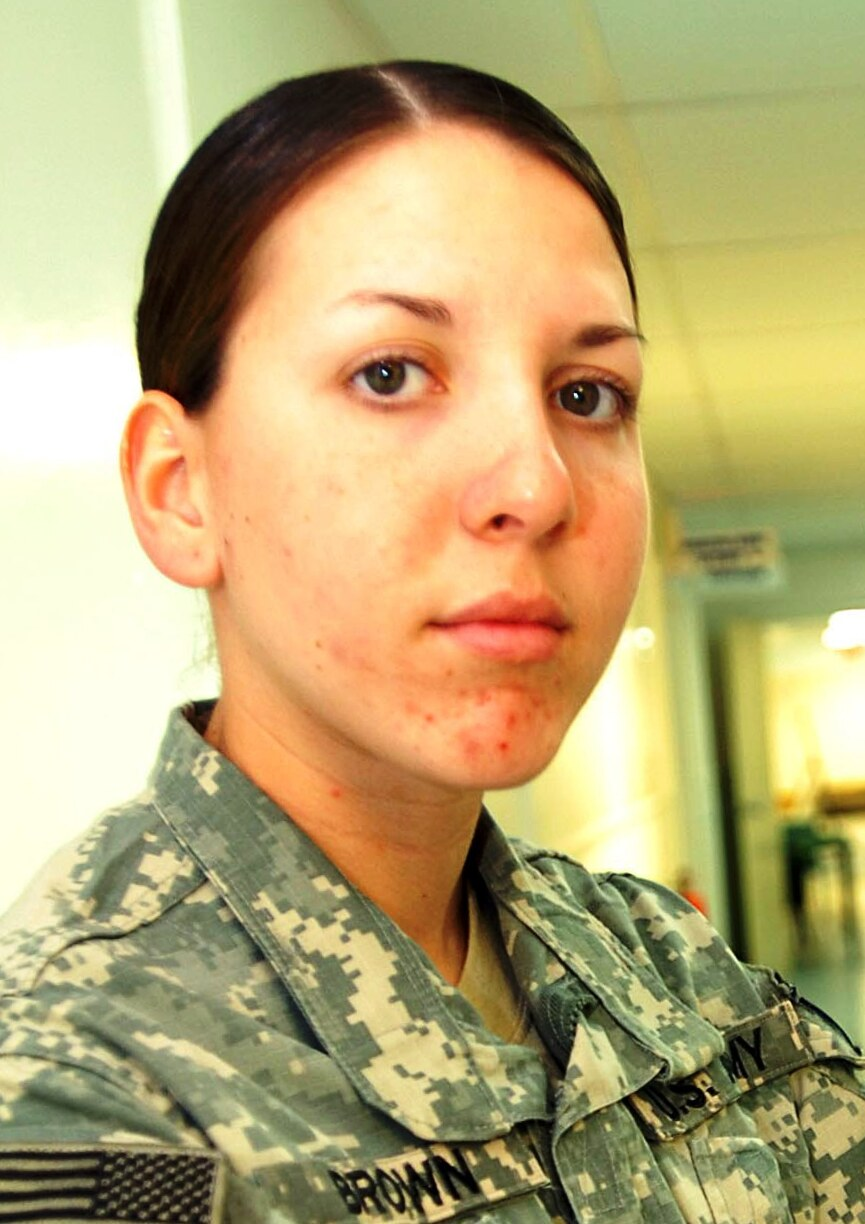
- Brown at FOB Salerno, Afghanistan, in 2008
- Born: 24 May 1988 (age 38); Lake Jackson, Texas, U.S.
- Military career
- Allegiance: United States
- Branch: United States Army
- Service years: 2005–present
- Rank: Sergeant
- Units: 782nd Brigade Support Battalion, 4th Brigade Combat Team, 82nd Airborne Division
- Conflicts: War in Afghanistan; Operation Enduring Freedom
- Awards: Silver Star

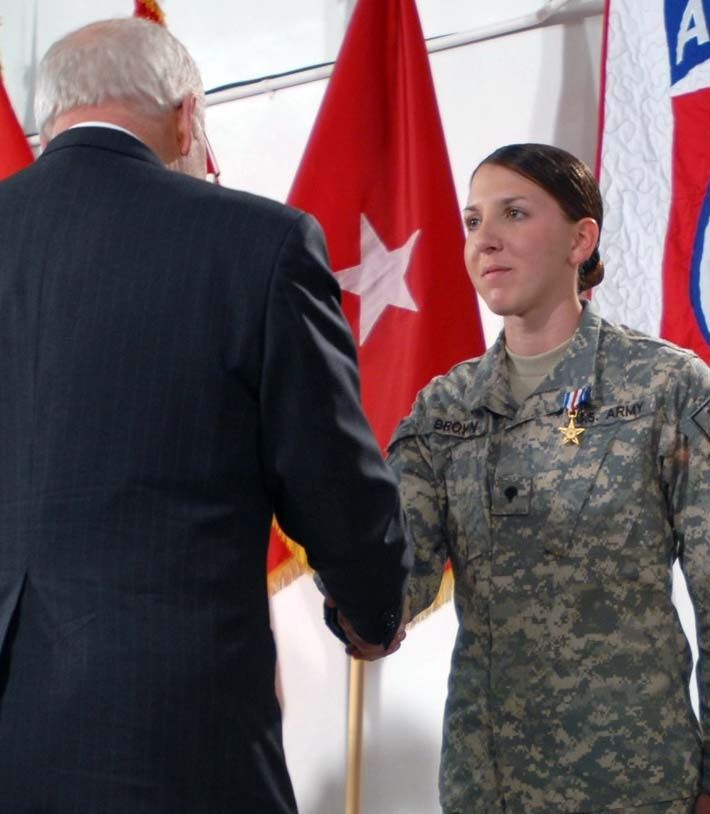
Brown receives the Silver Star from Vice President Dick Cheney in March 2008.

Monica Lin Brown (born 24 May 1988) is a United States Army sergeant and medic who became the first woman during the War in Afghanistan and only the second woman since World War II to receive the Silver Star, the United States military's third-highest medal for valor in combat.

== Career ==
In April 2007, after a roadside bomb detonated near a convoy of Humvees in the eastern Paktia Province of Afghanistan, Private First Class Brown saved the lives of fellow soldiers by running through insurgent gunfire to reach the wounded and then using her body to shield them while mortar rounds fell nearby. Because women were not formally allowed to participate directly in combat at the time, Brown was pulled back to the base at Khost shortly after the incident.

Brown, who joined the Army at age 17, was presented with the Silver Star by Vice President Dick Cheney in a ceremony on 21 March 2008.

In 2014, the U.S. Army Women's Foundation inducted SGT Monica L. Brown into the Hall of Fame.

== Military awards ==
Brown's military decorations and awards include:

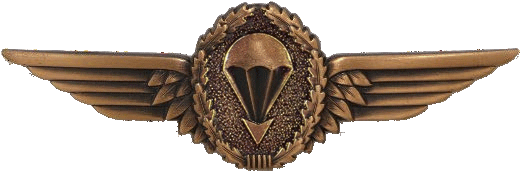
Silver Star
Army Commendation Medal
Army Achievement Medal
Presidential Unit Citation
Meritorious Unit Commendation with bronze oak leaf cluster
Army Superior Unit Award
National Defense Service Medal
Afghanistan Campaign Medal with service star
Global War on Terrorism Service Medal
NCO Professional Development Ribbon
Army Service Ribbon
Army Overseas Service Medal
NATO Medal (with ISAF clasp)
Combat Medical Badge
Basic Parachutist Badge
German Parachutist Badge in bronze

=== Silver Star ===
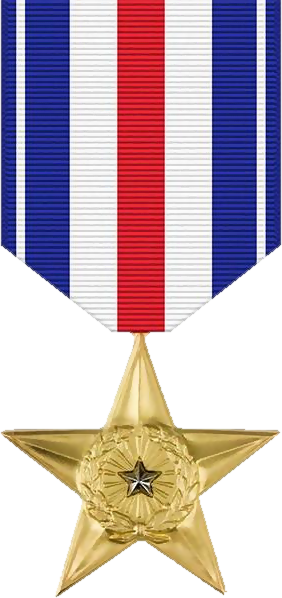

Citation:

The President of the United States of America, authorized by Act of Congress July 9, 1918 (amended by an act of July 25, 1963), takes pleasure in presenting the Silver Star to Specialist [then Private First Class] Monica Lin Brown, United States Army, for extraordinary heroism while serving as a Combat Medic with the 4th Squadron, 73d Cavalry Regiment, 4th Brigade Combat Team, 82nd Airborne Division, in action on 25 April 2007. On that date, 2d Platoon, Charlie Troop, 4th Squadron, 73d Cavalry Regiment, was on a combat patrol moving to Jani Khel, Afghanistan, for a leader engagement with the village elders. The element consisted of five vehicles: four M1151 Uparmored HMMWV's (UAH) and one Afghan National Army (ANA) Ford Ranger. They were in a column formation moving north along Route VIPER. In the vicinity of 42S VA263021 the trail vehicle, C23, struck a pressure plate IED on the driver's side rear tire, which ignited the fuel tank and fuel cans mounted on the rear of the vehicle. The explosion of the fuel tank and cans engulfed the vehicle in an intense fireball. This initiated a planned ambush which commenced after the explosion. The patrol began to take small arms fire from the direction of a kholat to the east, approximately 100 meters away. The small arms fire was impacting around the lead vehicle which was 300 meters north of the IED site. The small arms fire began to concentrate on the IED site as the Platoon Medic, Private First Class Brown, moved on foot to evaluate the casualties. She was exposed to the small arms fire until the maneuver element could swing around and begin suppressing the enemy as she treated the wounded Soldiers. After making an initial assessment and treating in order of severity, she moved the casualties with the aid and direction of the Platoon Sergeant, into the wadi the engulfed vehicle was hanging over. The enemy fighters then engaged the patrol with mortar fire. Private First Class Brown threw her own body over the casualties to shield them as the mortars were impacting 75 to 100 meters away. Approximately 15 mortars impacted within close range of the casualties as Private First Class Brown continued treatment. Private First Class Brown continued treatment in the wadi approximately 15 meters from the burning vehicle, at which time the onboard 60-mm. mortar, 5.56-mm. ammunition, and 40-mm. grenade rounds on board began to explode. Again disregarding her own safety, Private First Class Brown shielded the casualties with her own body as large chunks of shrapnel and 5.56-mm. rounds began flying through the air from the burning vehicle. The patrol leader arrived on site and found it incredible she was still alive and treating the casualties amidst the extremely dangerous conditions she was operating under. Given the hazards to Private First Class Brown, the platoon sergeant used the ANA Ranger to move the wounded Soldiers and Private First Class Brown to a more protected position. As the truck began driving down the wadi, a large 60-mm. mortar explosion occurred sending shrapnel flying all around where Private First Class Brown had been treating casualties. The platoon leader was dragged by the ANA truck with the casualties as the explosions became incredibly intense and the platoon sergeant moved Private First Class Brown to a more protected position to continue treatment. Private First Class Brown continued treatment of the two wounded Soldiers at the new site as enemy small arms fire began to impact around the new position. Private First Class Brown continued treatment of the casualties as the platoon returned fire in close vicinity of her. She shielded the wounded from falling brass and enemy fire once again, ensuring the casualties were stabilized and ready for MEDEVAC. Specialist Brown's heroic actions are in keeping with the finest traditions of military service, reflecting great credit upon herself, the 82d Airborne Division, and the United States Army.

== See also ==
- Leigh Ann Hester
- Monica Beltran
