= John Brown Kerr =

United States Army general

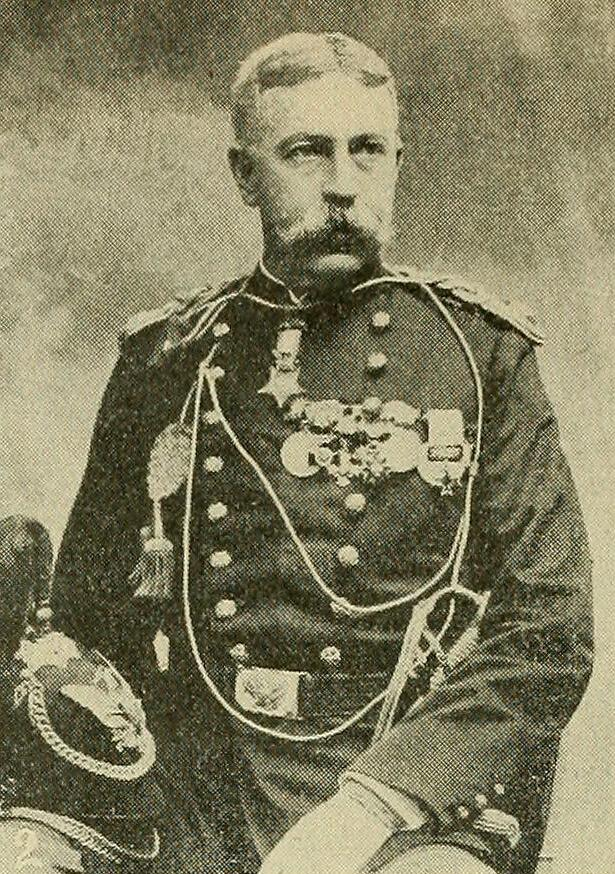
- Col. John B. Kerr in 1904
- Born: March 12, 1847; Lexington, Kentucky, US
- Died: February 27, 1928 (aged 80); Washington, D.C., US
- Burial place: Arlington National Cemetery
- Military career
- Allegiance: United States of America
- Branch: United States Army
- Service years: 1870–1909
- Rank: Brigadier General
- Unit: 6th Cavalry Regiment
- Commands: 12th Cavalry Regiment
- Conflicts: American Indian Wars; Spanish–American War; Philippine–American War
- Awards: Medal of Honor; Silver Star

John Brown Kerr (March 12, 1847 – February 27, 1928) was a United States Army Brigadier General who was a recipient of the Medal of Honor for actions in fighting Indians along the White River, South Dakota.

== Early life and the western frontier ==
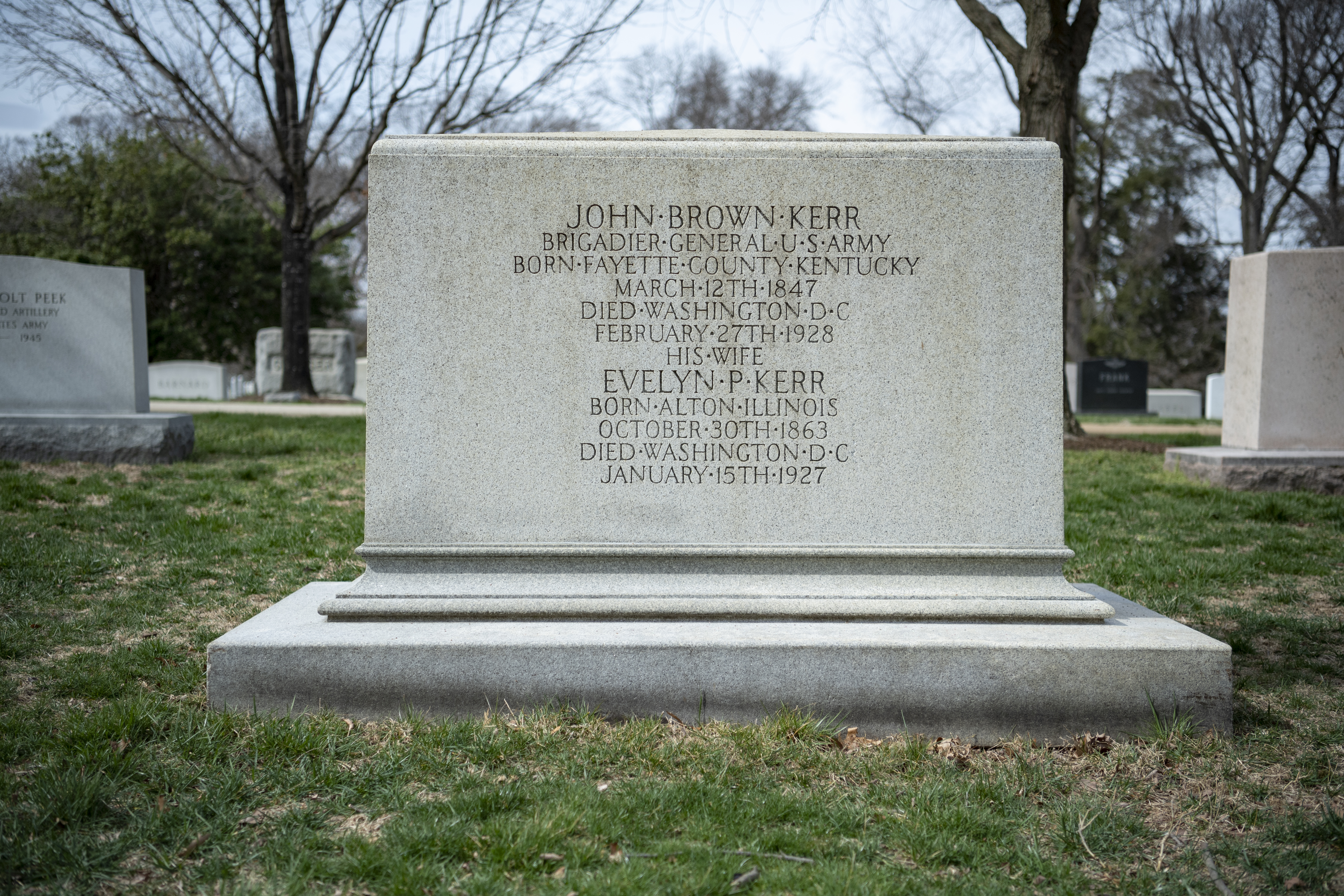
Grave at Arlington National Cemetery

Kerr was born near Lexington, Kentucky, on March 12, 1847. Kerr was an 1870 graduate of West Point.

He spent most of his Army career on the western frontier, chiefly as a scout in the 6th Cavalry Regiment on the western frontier. On January 1, 1891, he commanded his troop of the 6th U.S. Cavalry in action against the Sioux on the north bank of the White River in South Dakota. In this action, he defeated a force of 300 Brule Sioux warriors and was awarded the Medal of Honor for this action in April of the same year.

== Spanish–American War ==
In the Spanish–American War, he fought at the Battle of San Juan Hill as a captain in the 2nd Squadron of the 10th Cavalry Regiment. He was promoted to major in the same regiment in October 1898. He received a citation for gallantry in action during the Santiago campaign. The citation was later converted to the Silver Star when the award was created in 1932.

In May 1901 he was promoted to lieutenant colonel and assigned to the 9th Cavalry Regiment. On July 15, 1902, he was detailed as an assistant adjutant general.

== Later career ==
In 1903 he was promoted to colonel and commanded the 12th Cavalry Regiment in the Philippine–American War. He was promoted to brigadier general in 1908, and commanded the Mounted Service School until his retirement from the Army on May 20, 1909.

He died at Garfield Hospital in Washington, D.C., on February 27, 1928, and was buried in Arlington National Cemetery on March 1, 1928.

== Medal of Honor citation ==
For distinguished bravery on 1 January 1891, while in command of his troop of the 6th U.S. Cavalry, in action against hostile Sioux Indians on the north bank of the White River, near the mouth of Little Grass Creek, South Dakota, where he defeated a force of 300 Brule Sioux warriors, and turned the Sioux tribe, which was endeavoring to enter the Bad Lands, back into the Pine Ridge Agency. General Orders: Date of Issue: April 25, 1891

== Awards ==
- Medal of Honor
- Silver Star
- Indian Campaign Medal
- Spanish Campaign Medal
- Philippine Campaign Medal

== Promotions ==
- 2nd Lieutenant – June 15, 1870
- 1st Lieutenant – August 1, 1874
- Captain – January 3, 1885
- Major – October 24, 1898
- Lieutenant Colonel – May 31, 1901
- Colonel – March 30, 1903
- Brigadier General – April 13, 1908
