= Jane Rignel =

United States Army nurse (1884–1977)

Jane I. Rignel St. John ARRC (June 16, 1884 – April 1, 1977) was a United States Army nurse who was the Chief Nurse of Mobile Hospital No. 2 during World War I. For her heroism she was awarded the French Croix de Guerre, the British Royal Red Cross, and the United States Silver Star medal.

== Early life, education, and early career ==
Jane I Rignel was born in Lockport, New York. She graduated from Columbia University Presbyterian School of Nursing in 1913.

After graduation, Rignel went to work at Western Electric Company plant in New York City where she established a workmen's compensation health aid station.

== World War I ==
World War I hospitals were often organized around civilian hospitals. In May 1917, Rignel joined the Army Nurse Corps. as Chief Nurse of Mobile No. 2 Hospital which was primarily staffed by personnel from the Presbyterian Hospital in New York.

On August 14, 1918, General John J. Pershing sent a commendation to the whole staff of Mobile Hospital No. 2 to recognize them for their courage under fire. For Rignel’s heroism she was awarded the French Croix de Guerre, and the British Royal Red Cross. As well, Rignel was one of three Army nurses that served in World War I (the other two being Linnie Leckrone and Irene Robar) who were cited in 1919 and 1920 with Citation Stars for gallantry in attending to the wounded while under artillery fire in July 1918. In 1932, they were authorized to exchange their Citation Stars for the newly created award called the Silver Star. In 2007, it was discovered that they had never been awarded their Citation Stars. The three nurses, including Rignel, were awarded the Silver Star posthumously in 2007.

== World War II ==
During World War II, St. John was the assistant director of the Nurse's Aide Corps of the New York Chapter of the American Red Cross.

== Family life ==
Rignel married Captain Fordyce B. St. John, the commander of Mobile Hospital 2, in 1919. The St. John's lived in Manhattan, New York and Woodstock, Vermont. Fordyce St. John, a professor of surgery at Columbia University, died in 1973.

=== Death ===
She died in April 1977 in New York at 92 years old.
