= Bull Allen (soldier) =

Australian soldier

Leslie Allen
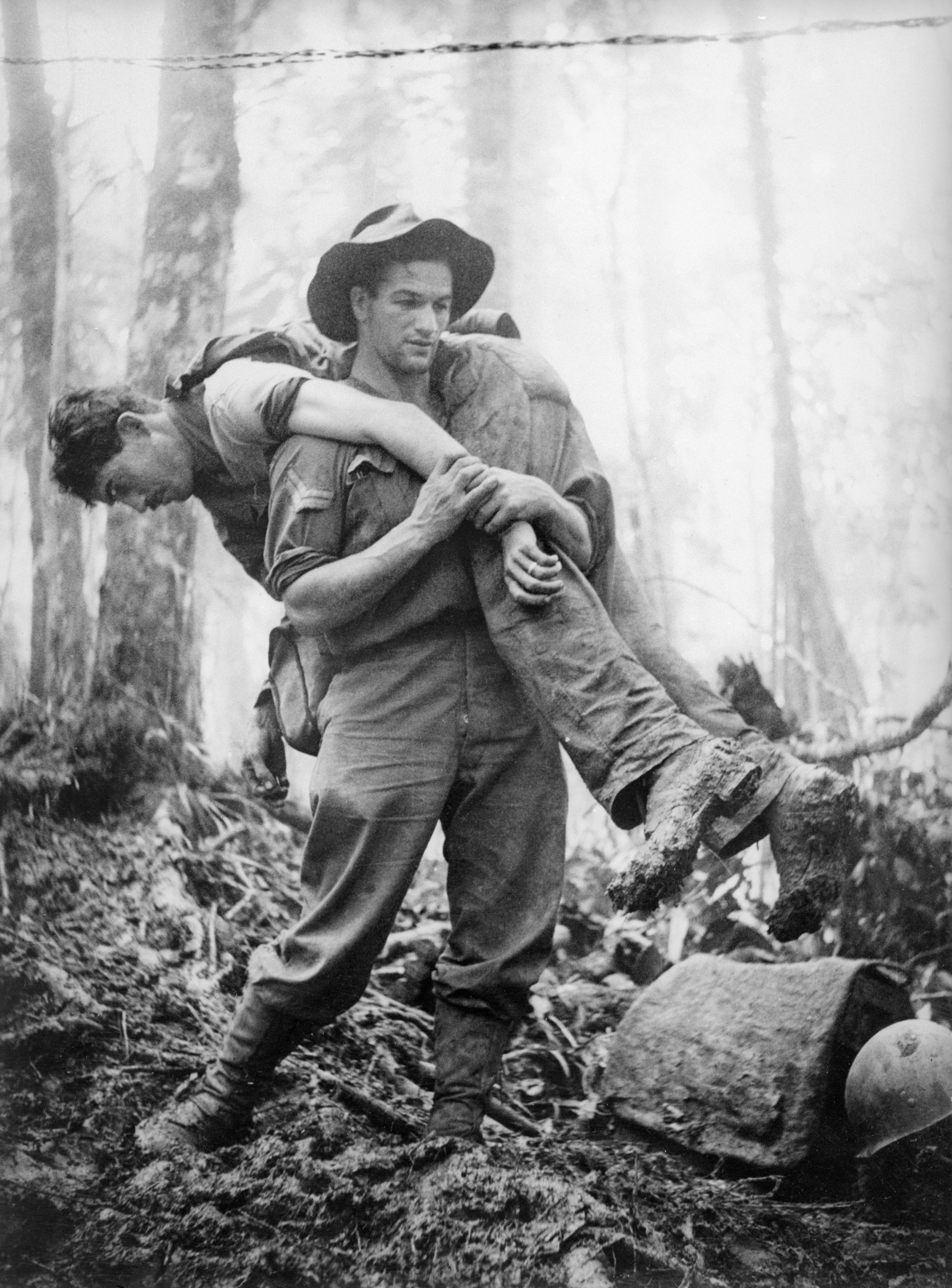
- Allen at Mount Tambu, July 1943
- Born: 9 November 1916; Ballarat East, Victoria, Australia
- Died: 11 May 1982 (aged 65); Ballarat, Victoria, Australia
- Military career
- Allegiance: Australia
- Branch: Second Australian Imperial Force
- Service years: 1940–1944
- Rank: Corporal
- Nickname: "Bull"
- Service number: VX12513
- Conflicts: Second World War; Western Desert Campaign; Syria–Lebanon Campaign; New Guinea campaign
- Awards: Military Medal; Silver Star (United States)

Leslie Charles (Clarence) Allen, MM (9 November 1916 – 11 May 1982), nicknamed "Bull" Allen, was an Australian soldier and a recipient of the United States' Silver Star. A stretcher-bearer, Allen enlisted in the Second Australian Imperial Force in mid-1940, volunteering for overseas service. He was posted to the 2/5th Battalion, an infantry unit, and deployed to the Middle East where he saw action in the Western Desert and Syria–Lebanon Campaigns, before his unit returned to Australia in 1942. He subsequently served in New Guinea. In July 1943, Allen took part in the Battle of Mount Tambu where he rescued twelve United States soldiers who had been wounded in the fighting. For this action he was awarded the Silver Star. He returned to Australia later in the year and was eventually medically discharged in 1944 after his mental health deteriorated. After the war, he worked as a labourer and as a medical orderly. He died in May 1982 at the age of 65.

== Early life ==
Allen was born on 9 November 1916 in Ballarat East, Victoria, the second son of Clarance Walter Allen, a labourer, and his wife Ruby Ethel née Robertson. After an early childhood involving domestic violence, Allen, his brother, and his sister were abandoned, then raised in an orphanage. From around 12 years of age, Allen started work, usually as a labourer on farms.

== Military career ==
Allen enlisted in the Second Australian Imperial Force on 19 April 1940. As a stretcher-bearer destined for the 2/5th Battalion, Allen left for the Middle East in September 1940. He was nicknamed "Bull" for the way he charged through the opposition when playing with the battalion in Australian rules football.

Allen saw action in the Western Desert Campaign early in 1941 and was shown to be reliable, but in early April was admitted with "anxiety neurosis" to hospital. He rejoined his battalion in time for the Syria–Lebanon Campaign where he attended to casualties all night under fire on 10–11 July 1941 near Khalde and walked for 10 km the next morning to get transport.

After serving in Ceylon (now Sri Lanka) Allen's battalion returned to Australia in August 1942, then in October sailing for Papua. Allen rescued wounded soldiers under fire around Crystal Creek on the 7 and 8 February 1943 for which he was awarded the Military Medal. — the citation stating: ‘Private Allen’s bearing and his untiring efforts in tending the wounded and helping with rations and stores were an inspiration’.

On 30 July 1943, at Mount Tambu, Allen safely rescued twelve United States soldiers and was later awarded the Silver Star—the citation stating: "Private Allen’s bearing and his untiring efforts in tending the wounded and helping with rations and stores were an inspiration". Allen returned to Australia in September 1943, his behaviour becoming unstable; in February, he assaulted an officer and was demoted. He was medically discharged on 10 September 1944 due to 'constitutional temperamental instability' with 'anxiety symptoms', in addition to several bouts of malaria.

== Later life ==
Temporarily losing the power of speech, Allen lived with an uncle while recovering. He married Jean Elizabeth Floyd, a former army nurse, in 1949. Allen worked as a labourer and then at the Ballarat Base Hospital as a medical orderly. Allen also worked at Sovereign Hill demonstrating a horse-drawn Chilean quartz-crushing mill for tourists.

Allen died on 11 May 1982 at Sovereign Hill of diabetes and a heart attack. He is survived by his wife, daughter and three sons.

== Legacy ==
The song "The Ballad Of Bull" by Swedish power metal band Sabaton, from their 2014 album Heroes, is about Allen and his actions in the Battle of Mount Tambu.

== See also ==
- List of Australian Silver Star recipients
- Desmond Doss
