= James Taggart Kerr =

United States Army general

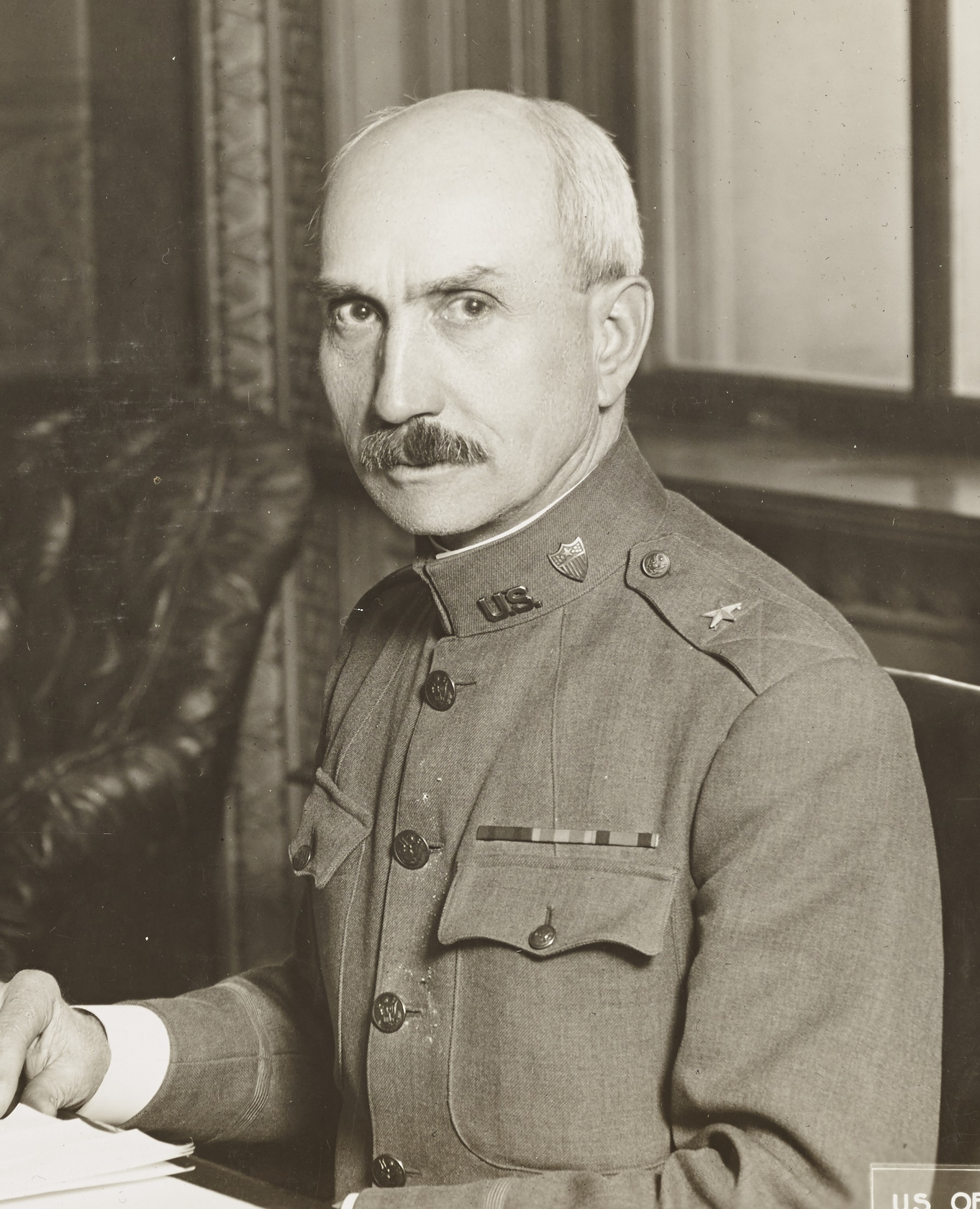
- J.T. Kerr as brigadier general in Washington D.C., 1919
- Born: April 22, 1859; Martins Ferry, Ohio, U.S.
- Died: April 13, 1949 (aged 89); Washington, D.C., U.S.
- Burial place: Arlington National Cemetery
- Military career
- Allegiance: United States of America
- Branch: United States Army
- Service years: 1881–1922
- Rank: Brigadier General
- Service number: 0-61
- Wars: American Indian Wars; Spanish–American War; Philippine–American War; World War I
- Awards: Silver Star; Distinguished Service Medal

James Taggart Kerr (April 22, 1859 – April 13, 1949) was an American brigadier general, who served with the U.S. Army. Kerr received a Distinguished Service Medal for his service with the Adjutant General's Department and 2 Silver Stars.

== Early years ==
James Kerr was born in Martins Ferry, Ohio, in 1859.

== Military career ==
Graduating, 28th in a class of 53, from West Point in 1881, Kerr was assigned to frontier duty with the 17th Infantry until 1888. He participated in the Ghost Dance War in 1890-1891 and was later an honor graduate of the Infantry and Cavalry School at Fort Leavenworth in 1897.

=== Spanish–American War ===
Kerr saw action in Cuba during the Spanish–American War, and received a Silver Star Commendation for his actions before being transferred to the Sanitary Corps.

=== Philippine–American War ===
Shortly after his assignment to the Sanitary Corps in Cuba, Kerr was sent to the Philippines to take part in the suppression of the Philippine rebels, for which he received a second Silver Star.

=== First World War ===
Kerr had initially retired in August 1914 due to physical disabilities contracted earlier in his career, but was recalled to active duty in 1917 following the U.S. entry into the First World War. During the First World War, Kerr served in the Adjutant General's Department until the end of the war, and was Assistant Adjutant General from 1920 until his retirement in 1922. He was awarded a Distinguished Service Medal for his service with the Adjutant General's Department.

== Death ==
James Taggart Kerr died on 13 April 1949, aged eighty-nine. He is buried at Arlington National Cemetery.
