= Leigh Ann Hester =

American soldier who was awarded the Silver Star

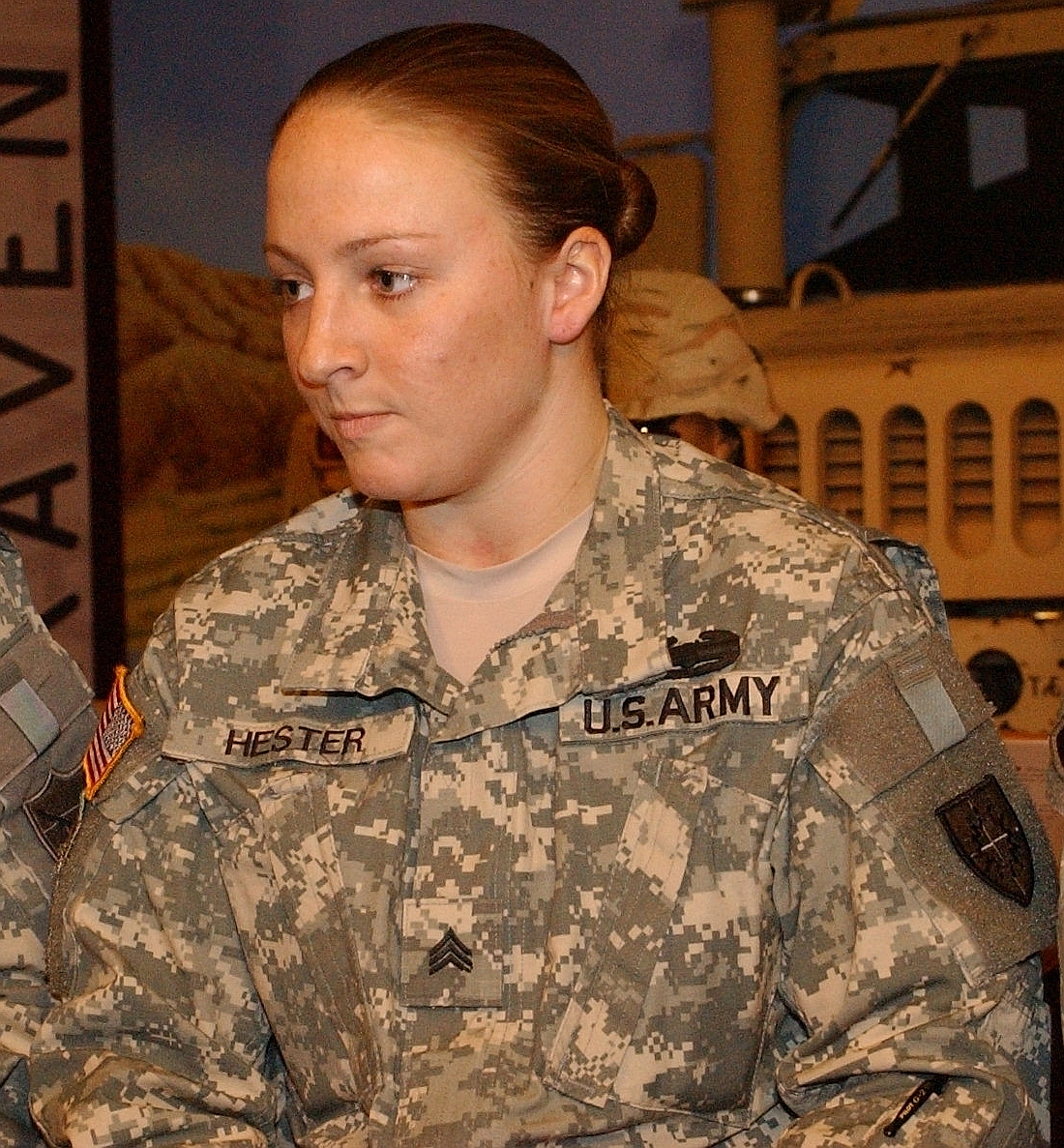
- Hester visiting the U.S. Army Women's Museum at Fort Lee, Virginia in February 2007.
- Born: January 12, 1982 (age 44); Bowling Green, Kentucky, U.S.
- Military career
- Allegiance: United States
- Branch: United States Army: Kentucky Army National Guard; Tennessee Army National Guard
- Service years: 2001–2009, 2010–present
- Rank: First Sergeant
- Units: 617th Military Police Company; 269th Military Police Company
- Conflicts: Iraq War; War in Afghanistan
- Awards: Silver Star; Bronze Star Medal; Army Commendation Medal
- Other work: Law enforcement officer

Leigh Ann Hester (born January 12, 1982) is a United States Army National Guard soldier. While assigned to the 617th Military Police Company, a Kentucky Army National Guard unit out of Richmond, Kentucky, Hester received the Silver Star for her heroic actions on 20 March 2005 during an enemy ambush on a supply convoy near the town of Salman Pak, Iraq.

Hester is the first woman in the Army to receive the Silver Star since World War II and the first ever woman in the Army to receive it for valor in combat.

== Career ==
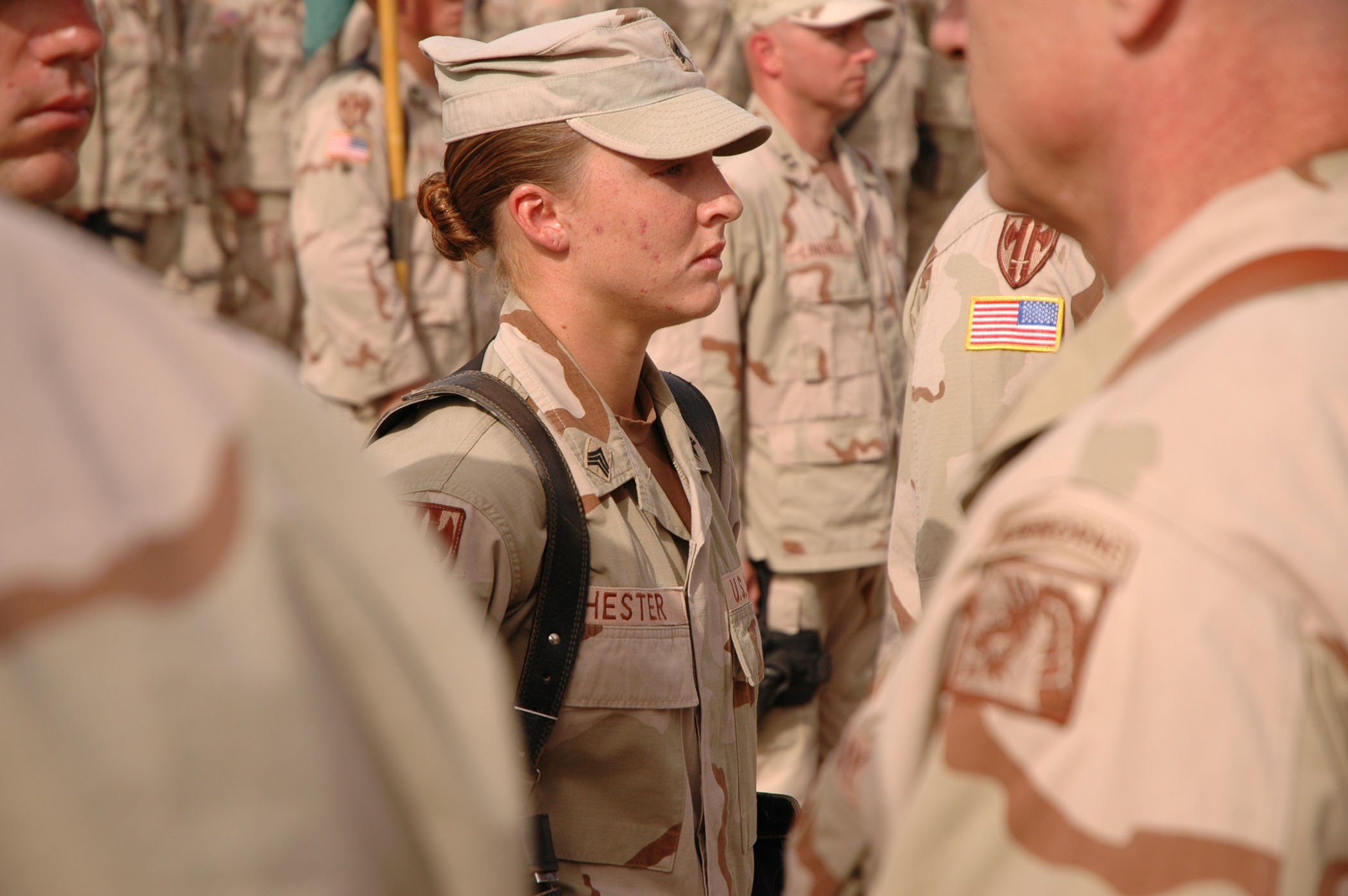
Hester waiting to receive her Silver Star medal during a military awards ceremony at Camp Liberty, Iraq in June 2005.

=== 2000s ===
Hester enlisted in the U.S. Army in April 2001.

In Iraq, Hester's military police squad, consisting of eight men and two women in three Humvees, were shadowing a 30-truck supply convoy when approximately 50 insurgent fighters ambushed the convoy with AK-47, RPK machine gun fire, and rocket propelled grenades (RPG). The squad moved to the side of the road, flanking the insurgents and cutting off their escape route. Hester maneuvered her fire team through the kill zone and into a flanking position, where her squad leader, Staff Sergeant Timothy F. Nein, and she assaulted a trench line with hand grenades and M203 grenade launcher rounds. Nein and Hester assaulted and cleared two trenches. During the 25-minute firefight, Hester killed 3 insurgents.

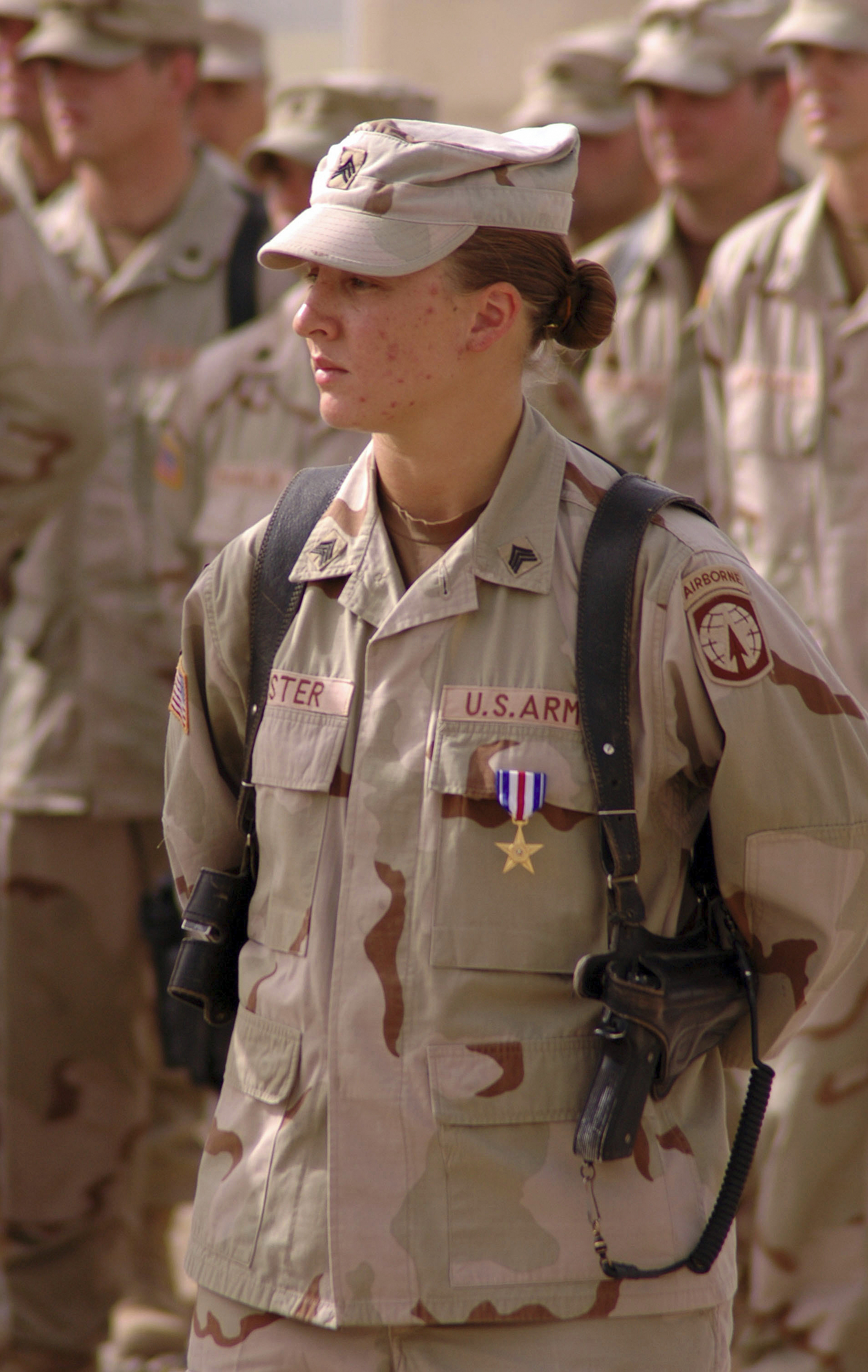
Hester after receiving her Silver Star medal during a military awards ceremony at Camp Liberty, Iraq in June 2005.

When the battle was over, 27 insurgents were dead, six were wounded, and one captured. Sergeants Nein and Hester were both awarded the Silver Star. Nein's medal was later upgraded to the Distinguished Service Cross.

Also awarded the Silver Star in this ambush was Specialist Jason Mike, a platoon medic who took up and simultaneously fired an M4 carbine and M249 SAW light machine gun in defense of his comrades.

Hester later transferred to the Tennessee Army National Guard.

Hester took a brief break from the National Guard in 2009, and worked as an officer for a civilian law enforcement agency in a Nashville, Tennessee suburb. However, she returned to the military in late 2010.

=== 2010s ===
From 2012 to 2014, she served as an instructor at the 117th Regional Training Institute Military Police School. In 2014, she deployed to Afghanistan for 18 months as a Cultural Support Team member. Hester has since been promoted to the rank of sergeant first class. In 2017, Hester deployed to Saint Croix, U.S. Virgin Islands as part of the response to Hurricane Maria. Hester's military police company provided law enforcement support to the U.S. Virgin Islands Police.

== Awards and decorations ==
=== Silver Star ===
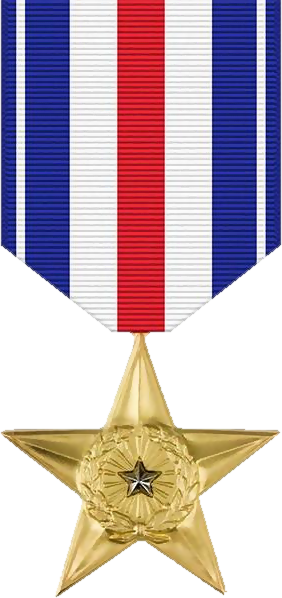

Citation:

The President of the United States of America, authorized by Act of Congress July 9, 1918 (amended by an act of July 25, 1963), takes pleasure in presenting the Silver Star to Sergeant Leigh Ann Hester, United States Army, for exceptionally valorous achievement during combat operations in support of Operation IRAQI FREEDOM, on 20 March 2005, in Iraq. Sergeant Hester's heroic actions in Iraq contributed to the overwhelming success of the Multi-National Corps-Iraq mission. While serving as the Team Leader for RAVEN 42B in the 617th Military Police Company, 503d Military Police Battalion (Airborne), 18th Military Police Brigade, Sergeant Hester led her soldiers on a counterattack of anti-Iraqi Forces (AIF) who were ambushing a convoy with heavy AK-47 assault rifle fire, PRK machine gun fire, and rocket propelled grenades. Sergeant Hester maneuvered her team through the kill zone into a flanking position where she assaulted a trench line with grenades and M-203 rounds. She then cleared two trenches with her Squad Leader where she engaged and eliminated 3 AIF with her M-4 rifle. Her actions saved the lives of numerous convoy members. Sergeant Hester's bravery is in keeping with the finest traditions of military heroism and reflects distinct credit upon herself, the 503d Military Police Battalion (Airborne), the 18th Military Police Brigade, and the United States Army. NARRATIVE TO ACCOMPANY AWARD: Sergeant Leigh A. Hester is cited for conspicuous gallantry in action against an armed enemy of the United States while engaged in military operations involving conflict with anti Iraq forces (AIF) as a team leader for Raven 42B, 617th Military Police Company, 503d Military Police Battalion (Airborne) stationed at Camp Liberty, Iraq on 20 March 2005, in support of Operation IRAQI FREEDOM. The team's mission was to assist Raven 42 in searching the Eastern Convoy Route for improvised explosive devices (IEDs) and provide additional security to sustainment convoys traveling through their area of responsibility. While patrolling Alternate Supply Route (ASR) Detroit, Raven 42B was shadowing a sustainment convoy consisting of 30 third country national (TCN) semi-tractor trailers with a three vehicle squad size escort, call sign Stallion 33, traveling from LSA (logistics support area) Anaconda to CSC (convoy support center) Scania. The weather for this ASR patrol was 75 degrees and sunny with a 10 knot breeze from the southwest. While traveling on ASR Detroit approximately 50 AIF ambushed the convoy with heavy AK47 fire, RPK heavy machine gun fire, and rocket propelled grenades (RPGs) from the southwest side of the road at 1140 hours. The AIF were utilizing irrigation ditches and an orchard for the well planned complex attack. The AIF had cars combat parked along a road perpendicular to the ASR with all doors and trunks open. The AIF intent was to destroy the convoy, to inflict numerous casualties, and to kidnap several TCN drivers or U.S. Soldiers. The initial ambush disabled and set on fire the lead TCN vehicle, which effectively blocked the southbound lanes of ASR Detroit, stopping the convoy in the kill zone. The squad leader, Staff Sergeant Timothy Nein, directed the squad to move forward, traveling on the right shoulder and passing through the engagement area between the enemy and the convoy. Sergeant Hester directed her gunner to provide heavy volumes of MK 19 and M240B fires into the field where an overwhelming number of insurgents were executing a well coordinated ambush on the convoy. Raven 42 elements were outnumbered five to one. Staff Sergeant Nein ordered the squad to flank the insurgents on their right side. The squad continued to come under heavy machine gun fire and rocket propelled grenade fire when Sergeant Hester stopped her vehicle, the middle vehicle, at a flanking position enfilading the trench line and the orchard field where over a dozen insurgents were engaging the squad and convoy. She then directed her gunner to focus fires in the trench line and the orchard field. Sergeant Hester dismounted and moved to what was thought to be the non-contact side of the vehicle. She ordered her gunner to continue to fire on the orchard field as she and her driver engaged insurgents in the orchard field with small arms. Sergeant Hester began engaging the insurgents with her M203 in order to suppress the heavy AIF fire. Sergeant Hester followed Staff Sergeant Nein to the right side berm and threw two well placed fragmentation grenades into the trench eliminating the AIF threat. Sergeant Hester and Staff Sergeant Nein went over the berm into the trench and began clearing the trench with their M4s. Sergeant Hester engaged and eliminated three AIF to her front with her M4. They then made their way to the front trench and cleared that as well. After clearing the front trench cease fire was called and she began securing the ambush site. The final result of the ambush was 27 AIF KIA (killed in action), 6 AIF WIA (wounded in action), and one AIF captured.

=== Commendations ===

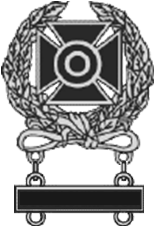
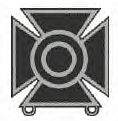

Badge	Combat Action Badge		
1st Row	Silver Star		Bronze Star
2nd Row	Army Commendation Medal with 1 bronze Oak leaf cluster	Army Achievement Medal with 1 bronze Oak leaf cluster	Army Reserve Components Achievement Medal with 2 bronze Oak leaf clusters
3rd Row	National Defense Service Medal	Afghanistan Campaign Medal with 2 bronze Campaign stars	Iraq Campaign Medal with 1 bronze Campaign star
4th Row	Global War on Terrorism Expeditionary Medal	Global War on Terrorism Service Medal	Armed Forces Reserve Medal with Bronze Hourglass device, bronze "M" device and award numeral 2
5th Row	NCO Professional Development Ribbon with award numeral 3	Army Service Ribbon	Overseas Service Ribbon
6th Row	Army Reserve Components Overseas Training Ribbon	NATO Medal for ex-Yugoslavia	Kentucky National Guard Faithful Service Ribbon (20 years)
Badges	Expert Marksmanship badge with pistol component bar		Sharpshooter Marksmanship badge with rifle component bar

== See also ==
- Monica Lin Brown
