= Silver Star =

United States military medal for gallantry in action

Silver Star Medal
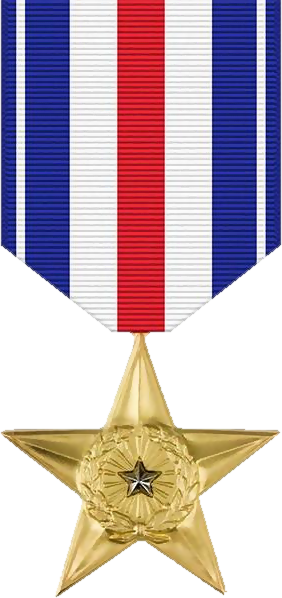
- Type: Military medal
- Awarded for: Gallantry in action against an enemy of the United States
- Presented by: United States Department of the Army; United States Department of the Navy; United States Department of the Air Force; United States Department of Homeland Security
- Eligibility: United States Armed Forces personnel, foreign allied personnel and civilians serving alongside U.S. military personnel in combat
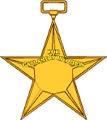
- Reverse
- Status: Currently awarded
- Established: 9 July 1932: Army Citation Star (SS) (Retroactive to 15 April 1861); 19 July 1942: Silver Star Medal; 7 August 1942: Navy, SSM (Retroactive to 6 December 1941); 16 December 1942: Army, SS (Retroactive to 6 December 1941)
- First award: August 1932 (WWI Army Silver Star conversion)
- Service ribbon

Precedence
- Next (higher): Army: Distinguished Service Medal (Army); Naval Service: Navy Distinguished Service Medal; Air and Space Forces: Distinguished Service Medal (Air and Space Forces); Coast Guard: Coast Guard Distinguished Service Medal
- Next (lower): Defense Superior Service Medal

Army Captain Gregory Ambrosia receiving the Silver Star from Navy Admiral Michael Mullen, Chairman of the Joint Chiefs of Staff

The Silver Star Medal (SSM) is the United States Armed Forces' third-highest military decoration for valor in combat. The Silver Star Medal is awarded primarily to members of the United States Armed Forces for gallantry in action against an enemy of the United States.

== History ==
The Silver Star Medal (SSM) is the successor award to the Citation Star which was established by an Act of Congress on 9 July 1918, during World War I. On 19 July 1932, the secretary of war approved the conversion of the Citation Star to the SSM with the original Citation Star incorporated into the center of the medal. Chief of Staff of the Army Douglas MacArthur played a key role in creating this medal, similar to how the Purple Heart was created, via modifying the Citation Star without needing Congress because Congress during this time refused to pass laws authorizing new medals.

Authorization for the Silver Star Medal was placed into law by an Act of Congress for the U.S. Navy on 7 August 1942, and an Act of Congress for the U.S. Army on 15 December 1942. The current statutory authorization for the medal is Title 10 of the United States Code, 10 U.S.C. § 7276 for the U.S. Army, 10 U.S.C. § 8294 for the U.S. Navy and U.S. Marine Corps, and 10 U.S.C. § 9276 for the U.S. Air Force and U.S. Space Force.

The U.S. Army awards the medal as the "Silver Star". The U.S. Navy, Marine Corps, Air Force, Space Force, and Coast Guard award the medal as the "Silver Star Medal". Since 21 December 2016, the Department of Defense (DoD) refers to the decoration as the "Silver Star Medal".

== Award criteria ==
The Silver Star Medal is awarded for gallantry, so long as the action does not justify the award of one of the next higher valor awards: the Distinguished Service Cross, the Navy Cross, the Air Force Cross, or the Coast Guard Cross. The gallantry displayed must have taken place while in action against an enemy of the United States, while engaged in military operations involving conflict with an opposing foreign force, or while serving with friendly foreign forces engaged in an armed conflict against an opposing armed force in which the United States is not a belligerent party.

The Silver Star Medal is awarded for singular acts of valor or heroism over a brief period, such as one or two days of a battle.

Air Force pilots and combat systems officers and Navy/Marine Corps naval aviators and flight officers flying fighter aircraft, are often considered eligible to receive the Silver Star upon becoming an ace (i.e., having five or more confirmed aerial kills), which entails the pilot and, in multi-seat fighters, the weapons system officer or radar intercept officer, intentionally and successfully risking his life multiple times under combat conditions and emerging victorious. However, during the Vietnam War, the last conflict to produce U.S. fighter aces: an Air Force pilot and two navigators/weapon systems officers (who were later retrained as Air Force pilots), a naval aviator and a naval flight officer/radar intercept officer who had achieved this distinction, were eventually awarded the Air Force Cross and Navy Cross, respectively, in addition to SSMs previously awarded for earlier aerial kills.

Unit award equivalent

- Air Force – Gallant Unit Citation
- Army – Valorous Unit Award
- Coast Guard – Coast Guard Unit Commendation
- Navy-Marine Corps – Navy Unit Commendation

== Appearance ==
The Silver Star Medal is a gold five-pointed star, 1 1/2 inches (38 mm) in circumscribing diameter with a laurel wreath encircling rays from the center and a 3/16 inch (4.8 mm) diameter silver star superimposed in the center. The pendant is suspended from a rectangular shaped metal loop with rounded corners. The reverse has the inscription FOR GALLANTRY IN ACTION. The ribbon is 1 3/8 inches (35 mm) wide and consists of the following stripes: 7/32 inch (5.6 mm) Old Glory red (center stripe); proceeding outward in pairs 7/32 inch (5.6 mm) white; 7/32 inch (5.6 mm) ultramarine blue; 3/64 inch (1.2 mm) white; and 3/32 inch (2.4 mm) ultramarine blue.

Ribbon devices

Second and subsequent awards of the Silver Star Medal are denoted by bronze or silver oak leaf clusters in the Army and Air Force and by gold or silver 5/16 inch stars in the Navy, Marine Corps, and Coast Guard.

== Recipients ==
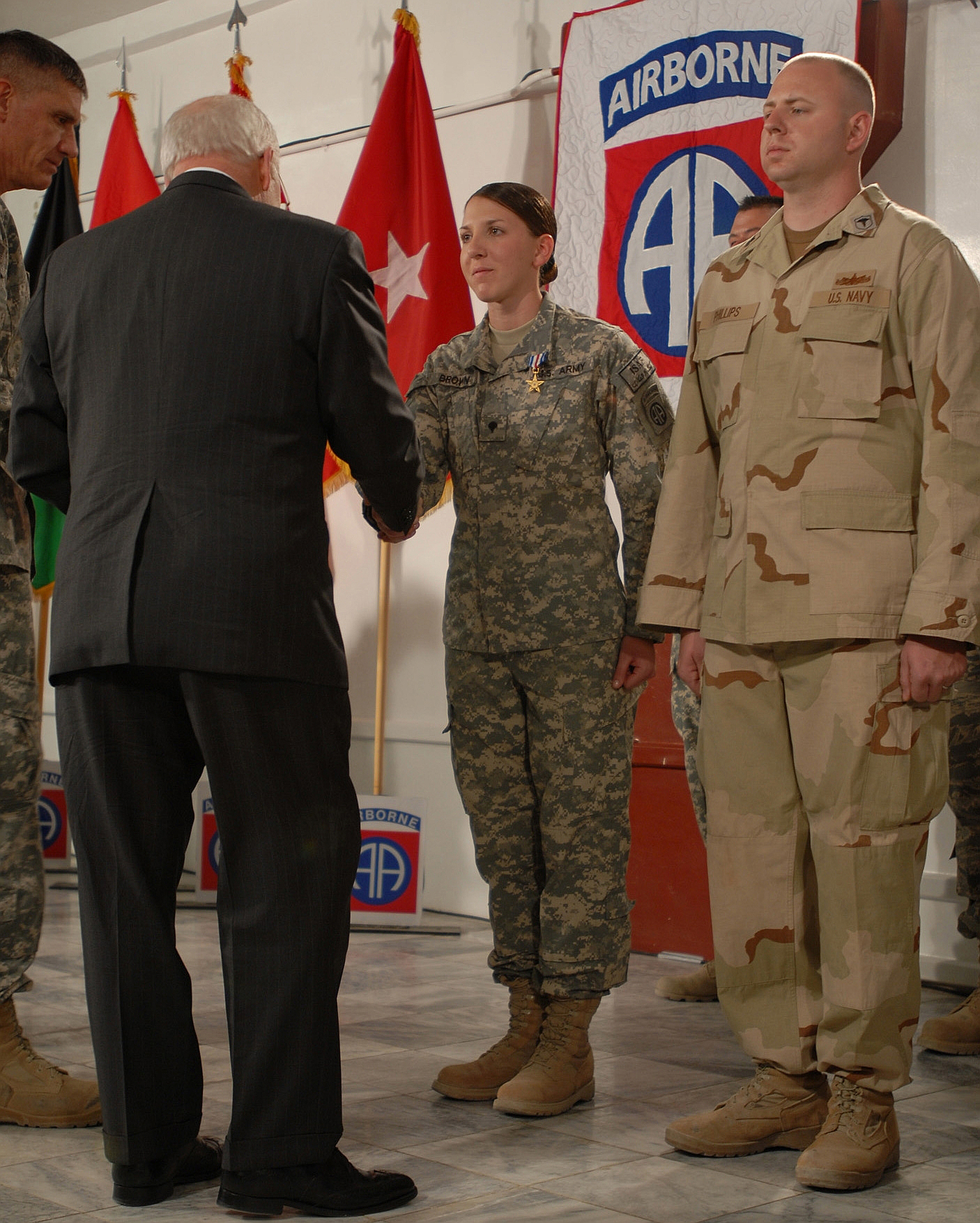
Army Specialist Monica Lin Brown receives the Silver Star from then-Vice President Dick Cheney, 2008

The Department of Defense does not keep extensive records for the Silver Star Medal. Independent groups estimate that between 100,000 and 150,000 SSMs have been awarded since the decoration was established. Colonel David Hackworth who was awarded ten SSMs while serving in the Army during the Korean War and Vietnam War, is likely to be the person awarded the most SSMs. General of the Army Douglas MacArthur was awarded seven SSMs for his service in France in World War I from February to November 1918 as a colonel and then brigadier general. Donald H. Russell, a civilian Vought F4U Corsair technical support engineer attached to a Marine Corps fighter wing, received the SSM for his actions aboard USS Franklin after the carrier was attacked by a Japanese dive bomber in March 1945. In the fall of 1944, President Roosevelt's close adviser Harry Hopkins, the U.S. Ambassador in Moscow W. Averell Harriman and a military attaché presented the SSM to Soviet Red Army artillery officer Alexei Voloshin, who was the first to cross the Dnieper with his battery and was one of four junior Red Army officers who received the award.

=== Female recipients ===
Three Army nurses that served in World War I (of no rank, since Army nurses served without rank until 1920) were cited in 1919 and 1920 with Citation Stars for gallantry in attending to the wounded while under artillery fire in July 1918. In 1932, the Silver Star was created and they were authorized to exchange their Citation Stars for Silver Stars. In 2007, it was discovered that they had never been awarded their Citation Stars. The three nurses were awarded the Silver Star posthumously in 2007:

- Jane Rignel – Mobile Hospital No. 2, 42nd Division, for gallantry in "giving aid to the wounded under heavy fire" in France on 15 July 1918
- Linnie Leckrone – Shock Team No. 134, Field Hospital No. 127, 32nd Division, for gallantry while "attending to the wounded during an artillery bombardment" in France on 29 July 1918
- Irene Robar – Shock Team No. 134, Field Hospital No. 127, 32nd Division, for gallantry while "attending to the wounded during an artillery bombardment" in France on 29 July 1918

An unknown number of servicewomen received the award in World War II. Four Army nurses serving in Italy during the war—First Lieutenant Mary Roberts, Second Lieutenant Elaine Roe, Second Lieutenant Rita Virginia Rourke, and Second Lieutenant Ellen Ainsworth (posthumous)—became the first women recipients of the Silver Star, all cited for their bravery in evacuating the 33rd Field Hospital at Anzio on 10 February 1944. Later that same year, Corporal Maggie Leones, a Filipino who later immigrated to the United States, received the medal for clandestine activities on Luzon; as of 2016, she was the only Asian woman to receive a Silver Star.

The next known servicewomen to receive the Silver Star were Sergeant Leigh Ann Hester in 2005, for gallantry during an insurgent ambush on a convoy in Iraq, and Army Spc. Monica Lin Brown in March 2008, for extraordinary heroism as a combat medic in the War in Afghanistan. Hester was the first woman in the Army to receive it for valor in combat.

On November 12, 2024, Capt. Lacie Hester was awarded the Silver Star for her role in the shootdown of 70 drones and three ballistic missiles launched at Israel, becoming the first woman in the Air Force, and the 10th woman in the U.S. military, to receive the Silver Star.

=== Other notable recipients ===
- Joseph H. Albers
- John R. Alison
- Darr H. Alkire
- Leslie "Bull" Allen
- Royal B. Allison
- Terry de la Mesa Allen Sr.
- Samuel E. Anderson
- Bernard L. Austin
- Lloyd Austin
- William Brantley Aycock
- Peter Badcoe (two awards)
- John Bahnsen (five awards)
- Vernon Baker
- Robert H. Barrow
- Olinto Barsanti
- César Basa
- Harry F. Bauer
- Walter C. Beckham(four awards)
- Charles Alvin Beckwith
- David Bellavia (Upgraded to the Medal of Honor in 2019)
- Rafael Celestino Benítez
- Frank Bladin
- Everett Ernest Blakely
- Albert Blithe
- Larry "Scrappy" Blumer
- Royal L. Bolling
- Richard Bong
- Paul Boesch
- Bruce Godfrey Brackett
- Omar Bradley
- Roland L. Bragg
- Neville Brand
- Maurice L. Britt
- Monica Lin Brown
- Hubert Buchanan
- Phil H. Bucklew
- Arleigh Burke
- Jess Cain
- Modesto Cartagena
- Alwyn Cashe (Upgraded to the Medal of Honor in 2021)
- Johnny Checketts
- Llewellyn Chilson (three awards)
- David Christian (two awards)
- Nestor Chylak
- Wesley Clark
- Max Cleland
- Lynn Compton
- Garlin Murl Conner (four awards)
- John Thomas Corley (eight awards)
- Alan "Ace" Cozzalio (two awards)
- Louis Cukela
- William J. Cullerton
- Roy M. Davenport
- Juan César Cordero Dávila
- Benjamin O. Davis Jr.
- Ray Davis
- Oliver W. Dillard
- William J. Donovan
- James H. Doolittle
- Wayne A. Downing (two awards)
- Hugh A. Drum
- Jesus S. Duran (upgraded to the Medal of Honor, 2014)
- Charles Durning
- Graves B. Erskine
- Douglas Fairbanks Jr.
- Joseph A. Farinholt
- Geoffrey Cheney Ferris
- Bernard Fisher
- Wayne Fisk
- Martin H. Foery
- Ronald Fogleman
- John W. Foss (two awards)
- Mayhew Foster
- Guy Gabaldon (upgraded to the Navy Cross, 1960)
- Francis Gambacorta
- James M. Gavin
- Hobart R. Gay
- Jerauld R. Gentry
- John J. Gilligan
- Luigi Giorgi (Italian serviceman)
- Mathew L. Golsteyn
- John W. Goode
- David E. Grange Jr. (three awards)
- David L. Grange (three awards)
- Charles H. Green (Cdr, 3rd Bn, RAR)
- John Campbell Greenway
- William Guarnere
- Ed Guthman
- Horatio B. Hackett
- David Hackworth (ten awards)
- Hugh William Hadley
- Alexander Haig
- Andrew Haldane (two awards)
- Robert Halperin
- Iceal Hambleton
- James C. Harding
- John Harllee
- Tom Harmon
- Raymond Harvey
- Carlos Hathcock
- Vern Haugland (first civilian award)
- Sterling Hayden
- Ronald J. Hays (three awards)
- Leo D. Hermle (three awards)
- Diego E. Hernández
- Leigh Ann Hester
- Clifford B. Hicks
- Thomas Taro Higa
- David Lee "Tex" Hill
- Tony Hillerman
- Samuel M Hogan
- Lucius Roy Holbrook
- Gordon Pai'ea Chung-Hoon
- Joe R. Hooper (two awards)
- Robert L. Howard
- Clifton James
- Jean, Grand Duke of Luxembourg
- Lyndon B. Johnson
- Phil Johnson
- Sam Johnson (two awards)
- James L. Jones
- James Taggart Kerr (two awards)
- John Kerry
- Jonny Kim
- Robert Kingston (two awards)
- Joseph Kittinger (two awards)
- Charles C. Krulak
- Chris Kyle
- Henry Louis Larsen (three awards)
- Ben Lear
- John C. H. Lee
- Kurt Chew-Een Lee
- Homer Litzenberg
- Elliott Loughlin (two awards)
- Douglas MacArthur (seven awards)
- Victor Maghakian (two awards)
- Fred K. Mahaffey (three awards)
- Peyton C. March
- Richard Marcinko
- George Marshall
- Richard Marshall
- Barry McCaffrey (two awards)
- John McCain
- Rob Roy McGregor (three awards)
- Herbert Raymond "H.R." McMaster
- Sid McMath
- John McNulty (two awards)
- William A. McNulty
- William K. MacNulty
- Merrill A. McPeak
- Charles B. McVay III
- Richard J. Meadows (two awards)
- Ray Melikian (three awards)
- Robert Mellard (two awards)
- Charles L. Melson
- Daniel J. Miller
- Michael A. Monsoor
- Cliff Montgomery
- Audie Murphy (two awards)
- Michael P. Murphy (upgraded to MOH)
- Raymond Murray (four awards)
- Bismarck Myrick
- Oliver North
- Henry Ringling North
- Levi Oakes
- Mike O'Callaghan
- Eric T. Olson
- Jorge Otero Barreto (two awards)
- Mohamed Oufkir
- Cortlandt Parker
- Roy Earl Parrish
- Moultrie Patten
- George S. Patton
- George Patton IV
- Keith Payne
- Endicott Peabody
- John J. Pershing
- Basil L. Plumley (two awards)
- Pascal Poolaw (four awards)
- Nick Popaditch
- Milton C. Portmann
- Charles E. Potter
- Geronimo Pratt
- Tommy Prince
- Francis Gary Powers
- Ralph Puckett (two awards)
- Chesty Puller
- Lewis Burwell Puller Jr.
- Agustín Ramos Calero
- William Wilson Quinn
- Edward F. Rector
- Stephen C. Reich
- Rick Rescorla
- Robert B. Rheault
- Karl W. Richter
- Matthew Ridgway (two awards)
- Antonio Rodríguez Balinas
- Pedro Rodriguez (two awards)
- Robert Rosenthal
- Barney Ross
- James N. Rowe
- Dick Rutan
- Alfredo M. Santos
- Paul Saunders
- Harold Schrier
- Leonard T. Schroeder Jr.
- Robert L. Scott
- Nate Self
- Arthur D. Simons
- Rodger W. Simpson
- H. Norman Schwarzkopf (three awards)
- Ben Schwartzwalder
- Sidney Shachnow
- Charles Bradford Smith
- Frederick W. Smith
- Oliver Prince Smith
- Ronald Speirs
- Michael G. Stahl (two awards)
- Brian Stann
- James Stockdale (four awards)
- George L. Street III
- Philip Streczyk (four awards)
- Samuel D. Sturgis Jr.
- Richard K. Sutherland
- Thomas Tigue
- Richard Tilghman
- Pat Tillman
- Michel Thomas
- Floyd James Thompson
- William F. Train II
- Matt Urban (two awards)
- James Van Fleet (three awards)
- Paul K. Van Riper (two awards)
- Humbert Roque Versace
- Nicolas Walsh (two awards)
- John T. Walton
- Rawleigh Warner Jr.
- Billy Waugh
- Jim Webb
- Haskell Wexler
- Kevin Wheatley
- Joshua Wheeler
- Charles Willeford
- James E. Williams (two awards)
- Royce Williams
- Jocko Willink
- Theodore H. Winters Jr. (three awards)
- Jerauld Wright
- Tahsin Yazıcı
- Chuck Yeager (two awards)
- Elton Younger
- Albert C. Zapanta
- Douglas A. Zembiec

=== Recipients of 5 or more Silver Stars ===
- David Hackworth – 10 – Korea, Vietnam
- John Thomas Corley – 8 – WWII, Korea
- Derrill M. Daniel – 8 – WWII, Korea
- Gilder D. Jackson Jr. - 7 - WWI
- Gerald C. Kelleher - 7 - WWII, Korea
- Douglas MacArthur – 7 – WWI
- Joel Thompson Boone - 6 - WWI
- Ellis Williamson – 6 – WWII, Korea, Vietnam
- Charles Getz – 6 – Vietnam
- Peyton C. March - 5 - Philippine American War
- Logan Feland - 5 - WWI
- Ralph S. Keyser- 5 - WWI
- David P. Colvin - 5 - WWI
- John Newton Middlemas - 5 - WWII, Korea
- Henry E. Emerson – 5 – Korea, Vietnam
- Thomas Tackaberry – 5 – Korea, Vietnam
- Frank Mildren – 5 – WWII, Korea, Vietnam
- Olinto Barsanti – 5 – WWII, Korea, Vietnam
- John Bahnsen – 5 – Vietnam
- Robert Lodge - 5 - Vietnam

== See also ==
- List of Australian Silver Star recipients
