= Colorado's 38th House of Representatives district =

American legislative district

Colorado's 38th State House of Representatives district
Representative
| Gretchen Rydin; D–Littleton |
- Demographics: 79% White; 1% Black; 11% Hispanic; 3% Asian; 0% Native American; 5% Multiracial
- Population (2024): 88,611

Colorado's 38th House of Representatives district is one of 65 districts in the Colorado House of Representatives. It has been represented by Gretchen Rydin since 2025.

== List of members representing the district ==
| Member | Party | Years | Counties Represented |
|---|---|---|---|
Single member districts implemented 1969
| Austin Frank Moore (Englewood) | Republican | 1969 – 1974 | Arapahoe |
| Stephen A. Lyon (Littleton) | Democratic | 1975 – 1976 | Arapahoe |
| James Doyle Reeves (Littleton) | Republican | 1977 – 1982 | Arapahoe |
| Phillip Lowden Pankey (Littleton) | Republican | 1983 – 1998 | Arapahoe, Jefferson |
| Joseph A. Stengel (Littleton) | Republican | 1999 – 2006 | Arapahoe, Jefferson |
| Matt Dunn (Centennial) | Republican | 2006 | Arapahoe, Jefferson |
| Joe Rice (Littleton) | Democratic | 2007 – 2010 | Arapahoe, Jefferson |
| Kathleen Conti (Littleton) | Republican | 2011 – 2016 | Arapahoe, Jefferson |
| Susan Beckman (Littleton) | Republican | 2017 – 2020 | Arapahoe |
| Richard Champion (Columbine Valley) | Republican | 2020 | Arapahoe |
| David Ortiz (Littleton) | Democratic | 2021 – 2024 | Arapahoe, Jefferson |
| Gretchen Rydin (Littleton) | Democratic | 2025 – Present | Arapahoe, Jefferson |
