= Robert Bowen (politician) =

American politician (born 1948)

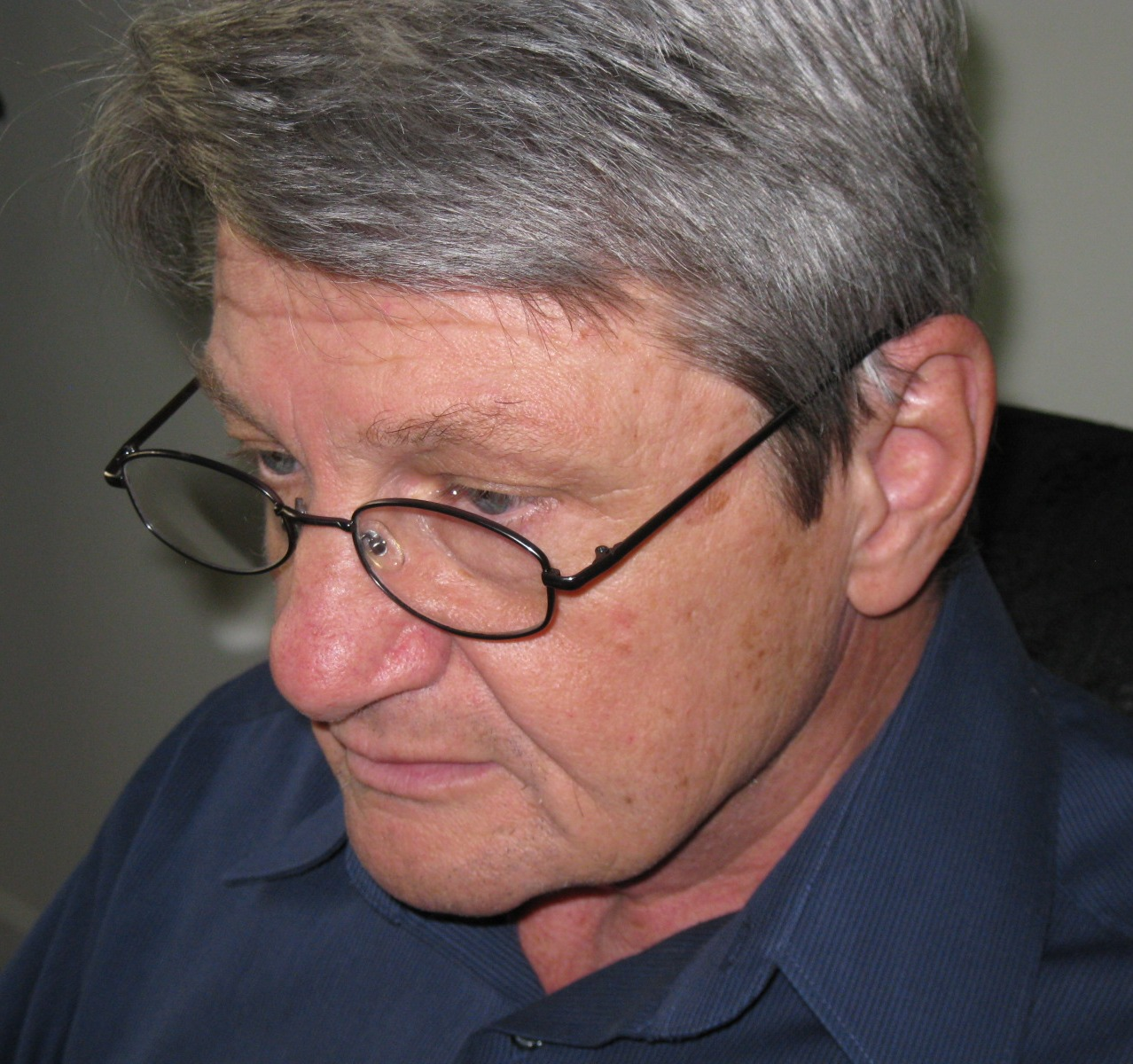

Member of the Colorado House of Representatives from the 4th district
- In office January 1983 – January 1989
- Preceded by: Miller Hudson
- Succeeded by: Donald Mares

Personal details
- Born: September 21, 1948 (age 78) Denver, Colorado, U.S.
- Party: Democratic
- Children: Robert Benesch Bowen (deceased); Christine A. Bowen
- Education: Metropolitan State University of Denver (B.A) 1971

Robert Bowen (born September 21, 1948) is an American former politician who was a Democratic state representative in Colorado between January 1983 and January 1989.

== College ==
Shortly after enrolling at Metro State, Bob Bowen (as he was called then) started an organization to lower Colorado's voting age to 18 called the Y.E.S. Committee. In 1968, the Colorado Commission of Higher Education (CCHE) decided to appoint an ad-hoc student representative, and Bowen was selected as the first student to hold that position. In 1969, he was elected student body president. He was also a leader in Colorado's non-violent protest against the Vietnam War. While he was student body president, the CCHE decided to combine Metro State College, the CU Denver Center and the Community College of Denver onto a single campus known as the Auraria Higher Education Center. There was a bond issue on the ballot in 1969 to raise $6 million for the purchase of the Auraria site.

Bowen and other students mobilized an army of 1,000 students who canvassed voters on behalf of the bond issue. Bowen spoke to nearly 100 community groups and as a result, the voters approved the bonds. Had it not been approved, federal funds would have been lost and the Auraria Higher Education Center would not have been built. City officials credited Bowen and the MSC students for the narrow victory. The following year, Bowen managed the campaign for Doug Holcombe for state representative, and he defeated long-time political boss, Mike Pomponio, as Democratic District Captain in northwest Denver.

== State representative ==
In the spring of 1982, Bowen announced his candidacy for State Representative in Denver's District 4. In November 1982, he won garnering nearly 72% of the vote. He was re-elected in 1984, and again in 1986 by similar margins. In 1988, Representative Bowen faced a primary and was defeated by Don Mares. Bowen lost by a narrow margin in a very low-turnout primary election.

During his three terms as representative, Bowen was regarded by his colleagues as a very effective legislator. He served on the Business Affairs and Labor and the Transportation and Energy Committees. Even though Republicans had a two-to-one majority in the house, Bowen began building bi-partisan coalitions around specific issues. He introduced bold, sweeping bills, many of which required several attempts before they finally passed. Even though he was known as a fighter, he had the respect of most of his colleagues because he always did his homework. Here is a list of seven of the 19 bills he sponsored that became law:

HB 1027: (1987) Concerning transportation needs of the state. This bill created Denver's Light Rail system setting forth routes, and it required RTD to present an implementation plan the following year. Bowen had to take legislators to Europe to view transit systems in order to change their minds on Light Rail Rep. Faatz (R-Denver) carried a competing bill, HB1249, on behalf of private developers. It created the TCA, a special taxing authority which allowed them to build one quasi-public line from the Tech Center to downtown Denver. The developer's lobbyists and the Denver Chamber of Commerce were successful in killing Bowen's bill in committee and passing HB1249. Undeterred, Bowen successfully amended his HB 1027 onto HB1249, and thus RTD built the metropolitan-wide light rail system (Within two years, the TCA collapsed and the southeast line ended up being built by RTD, as Bowen predicted at the time.) HB1019 (1987) Concerning custody of children: This bill changed the laws regarding child custody making it easier for a court to award mutual (joint) custody of children in a divorce even if one parent objected. It provided both parents with visitation and other decision-making rights. HB1336 (1984) Concerning the right to rescind purchase of a motor vehicle. This gave consumers a fixed-time in which to rescind purchase of a motor vehicle if they feel defects were concealed. HB1363: (1988) Concerning sale of motor vehicles. This was a consumer protection bill that provided rights to buyers of used vehicles. It required used-car dealers to provide customers with written disclosures, prohibited unethical practices. HB1216: (1985) The Older Coloradans Act. This bill codified all state programs that dealt with the elderly and made elder abuse an offense. It provided nursing home patients with rights, and improved the quality of life for seniors. HB1085: (1987) Concerning reapportionment of the Highway Commission. This bill changed the districts of the Highway Commission (which preceded the current DOT) to provide proportional representation to the counties in the metropolitan Denver area. At that time, the metropolitan area had 60 percent of the population, but had only 25 percent of the seats on the commission, and only received 40 percent of the highway budget. As a result of the re-districting, the metropolitan area began seeing a larger share of the construction budgets. It was replaced by CDOT years later. HB1484 (1983) Concerning second-hand goods. This closed a loophole in the law thus allowing police to check whether items for sale at flea markets were stolen. It extended the law that applied to pawn shops to flea markets. This helped police return stolen goods to the rightful owners.

=== 2014 and 2016 State House elections ===
In both 2014 and 2016, Bowen ran to represent State House district 38, having moved from Denver to Centennial. At the time, House District 38 encompassed Greenwood Village, Bow Mar, and Littleton, Colorado as well as parts of Englewood, Centennial, Aurora, and Columbine Valley. In 2014, Bowen lost to Republican challenger Kathleen Conti, and in 2016, he lost to Republican challenger Susan Beckman.
