= Joe Rice =

American politician (born 1967)

- Born: May 7, 1967 (age 59); New Castle, Indiana
- Education: New Mexico Military Institute (AA); Metropolitan State College of Denver (BA); University of Colorado Denver (MPA); United States Army War College (MS)
- Title: Former State Representative, Colorado House District 38
- Predecessor: Joe Stengel
- Successor: Kathleen Conti
- Political party: Democratic Party
- Spouse(s): Kendall Kershner-Rice, Ph.D.

Joe Rice (born May 7, 1967) is a former legislator in the U.S. state of Colorado, an Iraq War veteran, and a former mayor of Glendale, Colorado.

Rice presently works for Lockheed Martin Space Systems and also is a member of the United States Army Reserve. He was elected to the city council of Glendale, Colorado, in 1994 and to the post of mayor in 1996 on a platform of developing a "resident-friendly" community in the Denver enclave. Rice was re-elected in 2000 and later resigned from the post of mayor in 2003 when called up to serve the first of five tours on active duty in Iraq. In Iraq, he has served as an advisor to the Baghdad city council and to Iraqi security forces.

Rice won election to the Colorado House of Representatives as a Democrat in 2006 and represented House District 38, which encompassed Greenwood Village, Bow Mar, and Littleton as well as parts of Englewood, Centennial, Aurora, and Columbine Valley. While in the legislature, Rice focused heavily on transportation issues and was a key sponsor of a 2009 transportation funding bill increasing vehicle registration fees in order to address a backlog of bridge and transportation requirements. Other key measures he promoted included the creation of a statewide cold case homicide unit and a reduction in the business personal property tax. Rice served 2 two-year terms in the legislature, from 2007 to 2010. He narrowly lost re-election in 2010, losing by 51.5% to 48.5%.

== Biography ==
=== Personal life ===
Born in New Castle, Indiana, Rice earned an associates degree from New Mexico Military Institute in 1987 and a bachelor's degree in history from Metropolitan State College of Denver in 1989 while serving in the Colorado National Guard. He later earned a Master of Public Administration degree from the University of Colorado at Denver. Rice also earned a Masters of Strategic Studies degree from the United States Army War College in 2009.

After being discharged from active military duty at Fort Carson, Rice settled in Glendale, Colorado in 1990. Rice and his wife, Dr. Kendall Kershner-Rice, were married in 1990, and have three children — twins born in 2000, and a younger son born in 2005. They currently live in Littleton, Colorado. Among his hobbies, Rice enjoys jogging.

=== Military career ===
Rice enlisted in the United States Army at the age of 17. After two years of enlisted service, and completing ROTC, Rice spent three years on active duty as an Airborne Ranger Infantry Officer. His military service included duty in Bosnia-Herzegovina as a staff officer during UN peacekeeping operations, and as project officer for a Colorado National Guard program to provide medical care to poor civilians.

Presently a colonel in the United States Army Reserve, Rice has been called up to serve five tours of duty in Iraq — from March 2003 to May 2004, where he was a senior U.S. military advisor to the Baghdad City Council; from October 2005 to February 2006, where he advised coalition forces on interactions with Iraqi civilians; from October 2007 to January 2008, where, as an operations analyst, he evaluated Iraqi military and police forces; and from May to October 2009, where he was involved in training Iraqi security forces. In 2009, having experienced the situation in Iraq firsthand for multiple years, Rice described progress in security and government and supported President Barack Obama's military plans for Iraq and Afghanistan.

Rice has completed Airborne and Ranger training, and has been awarded the Iraq Campaign Medal, the Combat Action Badge, the Expert Infantryman's Badge, two Bronze Stars and the Joint Services Commendation Medal. Building upon his work in Baghdad, Rice has also helped coordinate the Baghdad-Denver Region Partnership for Sister Cities International since 2004. The partnership brought several delegations of Iraqis, including business leaders, government officials, and scholars. The most recent delegation was composed of Iraqi teenagers who lived with Colorado families. In 2008, Rice was appointed to the Board of Directors for Sister Cities International, and in 2009, he helped sponsor an Iraqi family's relocation to the United States.

=== Private sector career ===
From 1993 to 1995, Rice was the manager of Dismas House, a halfway house for ex-convicts. In his first legislative campaign, Rice was criticized for his association with Dismas House founder Bob Sylvester, who was found guilty in 2000 of sexually abusing inmates. The incidents for which Sylvester was tried occurred after Rice left his employment at Dismas, and Rice testified on behalf of the prosecution during Sylvester's trial.

Between 1994 and 2003, while in the National Guard and Army Reserve, Rice worked in the private sector as a customer service supervisor and trainer with MCI, JD Edwards, and Wells Fargo Bank. From 2004 to 2005, Rice worked in government relations for the Colorado Department of Transportation. At the time of his first legislative campaign in 2006, Rice also worked as a self-employed management and training consultant, and was vice president of RIGOR Engineering Corporate Services, a consulting firm specializing in engineering project management.

=== Mayor of Glendale ===
In 1994, Rice was elected to the Glendale, Colorado city council, running on a platform of shifting the small Denver enclave's business base away from adult-oriented businesses and towards a more "resident-family community." He was elected mayor in 1996. During his first term, Rice proposed new regulations on erotic dancers at Glendale nightclubs, garnering strong opposition from local business owners, who formed the "Glendale Tea Party" and elected three members to the city council in 1998 in response to the new regulations. Running for re-election, Rice faced opposition from Tea Party member Mike Dunafon, who promoted accusations that Rice used racial slurs and denigrated African-American and Mexican citizens. Rice was also criticized for being absent from Glendale during six months of his term as mayor, while he attended the U.S. Army Command and General Staff College at Fort Leavenworth. However, after an election that saw record campaign spending and record turnout for Glendale, Rice defeated Dunafon and was re-elected to a second term in 2000.

As mayor, Rice touted his efforts to lower city property taxes, expand city parks and open space, and open the city's first pre-school and recreation center. He served on the executive committee of the Denver Regional Council of Governments from 1995 to 2003, as vice-chair of the Denver Metro Mayors Caucus from 2001 to 2003, and received the John V. Christensen Award from the Denver Regional Council of Governments in 2004. In 2003, Rice resigned from his post as mayor during the last year of his second term after being called up to active military duty in Iraq.

== Legislative career ==
=== 2006 election ===
Republican Rep. Joe Stengel was term-limited in 2006 and could not stand for re-election to the Colorado House of Representatives from House District 38; both Rice and Republican Matt Dunn sought election to Stengel's house seat. In his campaign, Rice outlined his top legislative priorities as public safety, economic security, and quality of life. Rice was regarded by both conservative and liberal observers as a moderate Democrat, and is a member of the centrist Democratic Leadership Council.

Rice was endorsed by the Denver Post and by both union groups (including the local chapter of the teachers' union Colorado Education Association, and the Colorado Association of Public Employees, a branch of the Service Employees International Union) and business interests (including the Colorado Subcontractors Association and the state Chamber of Commerce, the Colorado Association of Commerce and Industry). He was also endorsed by Colorado Conservation Voters and the Colorado Medical Society. Rice ultimately defeated Dunn, earning 53 percent of the vote, and was sworn into office on January 10, 2007.

=== 2007 legislative session ===
In the 2007 session of the Colorado General Assembly, Rice was vice-chairman of the House Business Affairs and Labor Committee and a member of the House Transportation and Energy Committee.

During the 2007 legislative session, Rice sponsored 16 pieces of legislation, including 11 as the primary sponsor in the House of Representatives. Among the most prominent of his bills was a measure to set up a cold case unit within the Colorado Bureau of Investigation to investigate Colorado's 1200 unsolved homicides. After passage, Gov. Ritter signed the bill into law. Rice also pursued legislation to cut taxes for businesses by raising the personal property tax exemption. After having passed the state house unanimously, the measure died in a Senate committee.

Rice worked with fellow military officer and state senator Steve Ward on several pieces of legislation during his first term in the legislature. Rice sponsored legislation to allow military personnel serving overseas to apply for absentee ballots electronically; Ward was the Senate sponsor. Following the 2007 session, Rice and Ward called for Colorado to divest state pension funds from companies doing business in Iran.

Rice was a key player during House debate on a resolution critical of the ongoing War in Iraq; he supported amendments to the resolution to remove specific criticism of the 2007 troop surge, but supported the final compromise version, which called for eventual withdrawal from Iraq and passed on a party-line vote. Rice was also the house sponsor of legislation introduced in the Colorado State Senate to make driving without a seat belt a primary offense; the measure narrowly failed in the House despite Rice's objections during a heated debate that defeating the bill would "kill kids."

For his voting record during the 2007 legislative session, Rice earned a 4% rating from the fiscally conservative Colorado Union of Taxpayers and a 100% rating from the environmentally-oriented Colorado Conservation Voters; both ratings placed him at opposite end of the Democratic caucus from average Republican ratings. Following the regular session, Rice served on the legislature's Police Officers' and Firefighters' Pension Reform Commission and the interim Transportation Legislation Review Committee.

=== 2008 legislative session ===
At the start of the 2008 legislature year, Rice was still in Iraq on his third tour of duty. His absence was acknowledged by lawmakers during their opening speeches, his seat was decorated with yellow ribbons, and his children were invited to lead the Pledge of Allegiance on the first day of the session. During his time in Iraq, Rice met with Colorado Governor Bill Ritter, Congressman Ed Perlmutter, and Congressional candidate Jared Polis during their trips to the country, and also met with U.S. Marine and Colorado state senator Steve Ward, who was stationed in Iraq at the same time. Rice returned to the legislature on January 28, 2008, and was received with a standing ovation during the morning roll call.

In the 2008 session of the Colorado General Assembly, Rice sits on the House Transportation and Energy Committee, and is vice-chairman of the House Business Affairs and Labor Committee. During the session, Rice has explored introducing legislation to increase vehicle registration fees in order boost transportation funding, and plans on introducing legislation to make aggravated rape of a child under 12 a capital crime, eligible for the death penalty. Rice also introduced legislation to exempt some school fundraisers from sales tax, a measure which he placed on hold pending consideration of a broader measure by Rep. Jerry Sonnenberg. Rice and Sonnenberg ultimately combined their efforts and integrated the two bills, both of which became law.

Rice re-introduced a bill that had passed the House but failed in the Senate the previous year to raise the business personal property tax exemption, after the measure was endorsed by Gov. Ritter as part of his economic development platform. The legislation, which raised the exemption from $2,500 to $7,000, was ultimately passed by the legislature and signed into law.

Rice also hoped to sponsor legislation supported by Ritter to raise vehicle registration fees in order to fund road and bridge repairs, but failed to find a suitable cosponsor for the bill. Late in the session, though, Rice signed on as House sponsor on a measure to raise registration and rental fees to create trust funds for transportation; the measure was later dropped in favor of a bipartisan study committee between legislative sessions. In March 2008, Rice received the Bridge Builders Award from the Colorado Contractors Association for his work on transportation issues.

=== 2008 election ===
Rice sought a second term in the legislature in the 2008 statewide elections, facing Republican Dave Kerber. Holding office in a seat with voter registration numbers favoring Republicans, the race was expected to be strongly contested. Rice's re-election bid was endorsed by the Denver Post, and he ultimately won with 54 percent of the popular vote.

=== 2009 legislative session ===
Besides chairing the House Business Affairs Committee during the regular legislative session, in November 2008, Rice was named vice-chair of a special legislative Committee on Job Creation and Economic Growth, tasked with developing recommendations on bolstering Colorado's economy before the 2009 legislative session. The committee presented a slate of jobs-related legislation at the start of the 2009 session; one measure, sponsored by Rice, would offer tax credits to companies that create 20 jobs in urban areas or 10 jobs in rural areas. With Republican Rep. Amy Stephens, Rice also sponsored legislation allowing health insurance providers to offer discounts for participation in wellness programs. At the request of the Colorado Association of Transit Agencies, Rice also sponsored legislation requiring drivers to yield to transit buses re-entering traffic.

Towards the end of the session, Rice prominently broke with Democrats to oppose the removal of capital gains tax breaks and to oppose granting unemployment benefits to locked-out workers. Rice also sponsored legislation to create a hybrid public-private health insurance system to cover low-income Colorado residents; this bill passed the Senate and House but was not signed into law by the governor.

Rice was the sponsor of a major transportation funding proposal backed by Gov. Bill Ritter and other Democratic leaders, including Senate sponsor Dan Gibbs. The proposal, labeled "FASTER," an acronym for Funding Advancement for Surface Transportation and Economic Recovery, would yield $250 million in funding, aimed primarily at road and bridge repair, by increasing a range of vehicle registration fees. FASTER passed the legislature without the support of Republicans, who objected to the level of fee increases and called for resources besides fees to be used to support transportation; additional complaints surfaced from both Republican leaders and the public after the fee increases took effect.

Following the 2009 session, Rice was named a legislator of the year by the Southeast Business Partnership, and received the Chairs' Award for Outstanding Efforts in Economic Development from the Metro Denver Economic Development Corporation.

=== 2010 legislative session ===
Rice co-sponsored a bill which made multiple changes to the Colorado education system, it was signed into law on May 20, 2010. Rice also sponsored a bill related to the creative industry sector of the Colorado economy. The bill dedicated 1% of state capital construction spending towards funding public art for state capitol construction projects.

=== 2010 election ===
Rice's district, which contained more registered Republicans than Democrats, was one of those targeted by Colorado Republicans hoping to make gains during the midterm 2010 legislative elections. Rice narrowly lost re-election in 2010 to Kathleen Conti, losing 51.5% to 48.5% (892 votes out of 30,510 votes cast) in a district where Republicans outnumber Democrats by almost 10 points in voter registration.

== Life and public service after politics ==
After the 2010 election, Rice returned to work in the private sector, where he works as the Director of Government Relations at Lockheed Martin Space Systems. Though no longer in elected office, he remains active with a number of community organizations and civic groups.
