= 2026 Colorado State Treasurer election =

- November 3, 2026
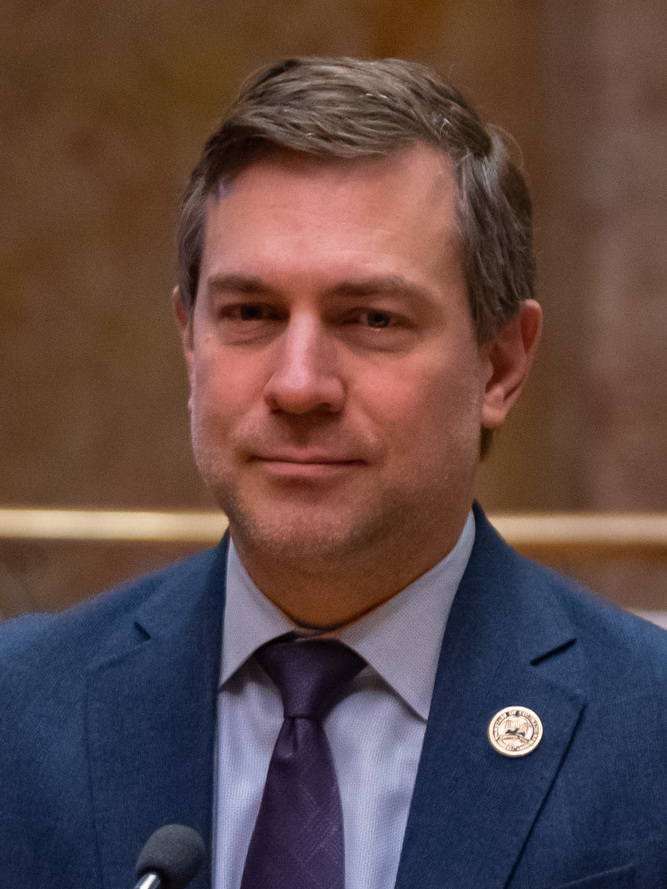

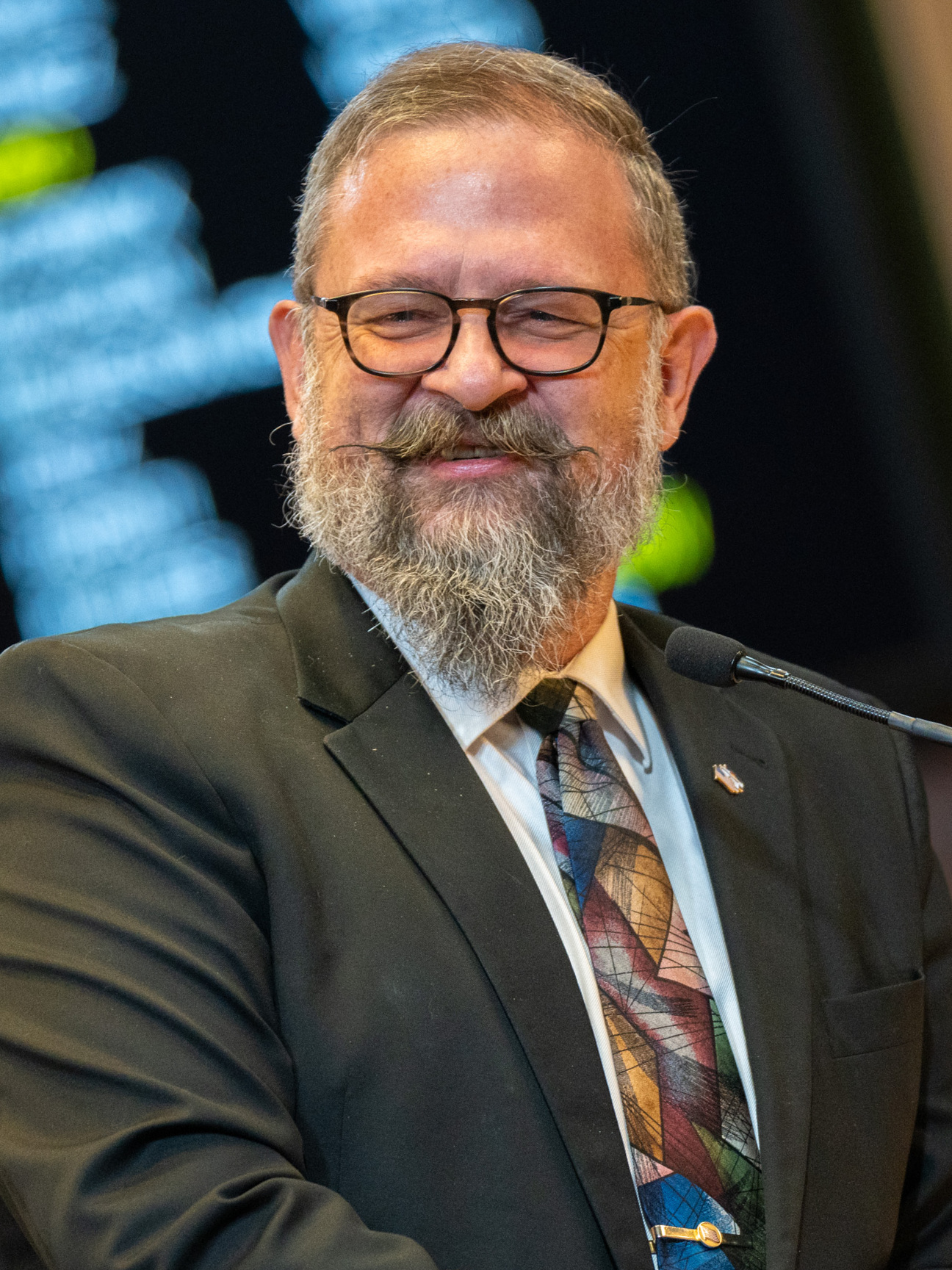
Candidate	Jeff Bridges	Kevin Grantham
Party	Democratic	Republican
Popular vote	1,533,604	1,006,682
Percentage	58.8%	38.6%
- Bridges: 40–50% 50–60% 60–70% 70–80% 80–90% Grantham: 40–50% 50–60% 60–70% 70–80% 80–90%
Treasurer before election
Dave Young
Democratic
Elected Treasurer
Jeff Bridges
Democratic

The 2026 Colorado State Treasurer election was held on November 3, 2026, to elect the Colorado State Treasurer. Primary elections were held on June 30. Incumbent Democratic treasurer Dave Young was term-limited and ineligible to run for re-election, initially choosing to run for U.S. House, but later withdrew.

== Democratic primary ==
=== Candidates ===
To move forward to the primary, candidates had to petition onto the ballot or achieve 30% or more at the Colorado Democratic Party State Assembly. No candidate petitioned onto the primary ballot. All candidates went through the State Assembly process. Jeff Bridges was the only candidate to achieve 30% or more.

==== Nominee ====
- Jeff Bridges, state senator from the 26th district (2019–present)

==== Eliminated at convention ====
- John Mikos, former chair of the El Paso County Democratic Party
- Brianna Titone, state representative from the 27th district (2019–present)

==== Withdrawn ====
- Jerry DiTullio, Jefferson County Treasurer

=== Endorsements ===
Jeff Bridges

Executive officials

- Ken Salazar, former U.S. ambassador to Mexico (2021–2025) and Secretary of the Interior (2009–2013)

State legislators

- James Coleman, president of the Colorado State Senate (2025–present) from the 33rd district (2021–present)
- Dylan Roberts, state senator from the 8th district (2023–present)
- Faith Winter, state senator from the 25th district (2019–2025)(deceased)
Brianna Titone (Eliminated at Convention)

State legislators

- Chad Clifford, state representative from the 37th district (2024–present)
- Javier Mabrey, state representative from the 1st district (2023–present)
- Janice Marchman, state senator from the 15th district (2023–present)
- Dafna Michaelson Jenet, president pro tempore of the Colorado State Senate (2025-2026) from the 19th district (2023–2026)
- Elizabeth Velasco, state representative from the 57th district (2023–present)

Organizations

- LGBTQ Victory Fund
- Advocates for Trans Equality
- Center for Freethought Equality
Jerry DiTullio (withdrawn)

State legislators

- Lindsey Daugherty, state senator from the 19th district (2025–present)
- Monica Duran, majority leader of the Colorado House of Representatives (2023–present) from the 23rd district (2019–present)
- Sheila Lieder, state representative from the 28th district (2023–present)

=== Results ===
Democratic primary results
Party	Candidate	Votes	%
Democratic	Jeff Bridges	713,618	100.0
Total votes		713,618	100.0

== Republican primary ==
=== Candidates ===
==== Nominee ====
- Kevin Grantham, Fremont County commissioner from the 1st district (2021–present) and former state senator from the 2nd district (2011–2019)

=== Results ===
Republican primary results
Party	Candidate	Votes	%
Republican	Kevin Grantham	447,606	100.0
Total votes		447,606	100.0

== General election ==
=== Results ===
2026 Colorado State Treasurer election
Party	Candidate	Votes	%	±%
Democratic	Jeff Bridges			
Republican	Kevin Grantham			
Libertarian	Jodie Barr			
Approval Voting	Marilee Langner Sturgis			
Total votes			100.0	
Democratic hold				
