= Steve Ward (Colorado legislator) =

American politician

Member of the Colorado Senate from the 26th district
- In office December 28, 2006 – January 7, 2009
- Preceded by: Jim Dyer
- Succeeded by: Linda Newell

Member of the Arapahoe County Board of Commissioners from the 1st district
- In office January 14, 1997 – January 8, 2001
- Preceded by: John Nicholl
- Succeeded by: Susan Beckman

Personal details
- Born: c. 1960
- Party: Republican
- Spouse: Susan

Steven P. Ward (born c. 1960) is an American former legislator in the U.S. state of Colorado. Appointed to the Colorado State Senate as a Republican in 2006, Ward represented Senate District 26, which encompassed southern suburbs of Denver, Colorado, centered on Littleton.

== Biography ==
Currently a resident of Littleton, Colorado, Ward has served as mayor of Glendale, Colorado and as a member of the Arapahoe County Board of Commissioners.

A colonel in the United States Marine Corps Reserves, Ward has served tours of active duty at Special Operations Command, in Afghanistan, at Northern Command, at the Pentagon, in Thailand assisting with recovery from the 2004 Asian tsunami and, in 2007, on an assignment in the western Pacific. In August 2007, Ward was called up to active duty in Iraq as part of the 2nd Marine Expeditionary Force, where he served as a military inspector general based at Camp Fallujah. He returned from his Iraq deployment in early February 2008, several weeks into the 2008 legislative session; he was greeted with applause from fellow Senators during the morning roll call. In recognition of Sen. Ward's deployment, Senators had continuously left a lamp on in the Senate chambers during his absence.

During his time in Iraq, Ward met with Colorado Governor Bill Ritter and Congressman Ed Perlmutter during their trips to the country, and also met with U.S. Army officer and Colorado state representative Joe Rice, who was stationed in Iraq at the same time.

Ward is married; he and his wife, Susan, have two children: Justin and Jessica. While not serving on active military duty, Ward operates a real-estate business.

== Legislative career ==
=== 2006 appointment ===
In November 2006, Senator Jim Dyer was elected to a post on the Arapahoe County Commission and resigned from the state legislature. A Republican Party vacancy commission chose Ward over former Centennial councilwoman Betty Ann Habig for the post. Ward was sworn in as a state senator on December 28, 2006.

=== 2007 legislative session ===
In the 2007 session of the General Assembly, Ward served on the Senate Health and Human Services Committee, the Senate Judiciary Committee, and the Senate Local Government Committee.

During the session, Ward introduced, with Democratic Rep. Rosemary Marshall, a measure to clarify uncertainties surrounding a gift ban in Amendment 41, an ethics reform ballot measure enacted by Colorado voters in 2006. After several months of legislative negotiations, the measure was killed in favor of a compromise implementing the ethics law as approved by voters; the ethics commission and gift ban later faced a string of legal challenges.

=== 2008 legislative session ===
In the 2008 session of the General Assembly, Ward serves on the Senate Judiciary Committee and the Senate Local Government Committee. He sponsored legislation, modeled on Louisiana law, to allow the death penalty as a punishment for rape of children. The bill died in a Senate committee only a few months before the Louisiana statute was ruled unconstitutional in Kennedy v. Louisiana. Ward was also a prime sponsor of a bill passed into law to restrict picketing in residential areas.

During the legislative session, Ward denounced as the "nanny state bill of the year" a measure which would require single-family homes to install carbon monoxide detectors.

=== 2008 Congressional campaign ===
Ward entered the race to succeed retiring Rep. Tom Tancredo in Colorado's 6th Congressional district in November 2007; he made the decision to enter the race while on duty in Iraq, citing a need for more Iraq War veterans in Congress. Ward was one of four contenders for the Republican nomination in the conservative district, including Colorado Secretary of State Mike Coffman. The contest saw few policy differences between Ward and his Republican opponents, with the exception of Ward's push for a "Manhattan Project"-type effort to develop alternatives to fossil fuels, including flex fuel standards for automobiles.

Although Ward trailed his opponents in fundraising, his campaign emphasized his web presence and his detailed policy proposals. As an Iraq veteran, particular attention was paid to Ward's position on the U.S. presence in Iraq. Although Ward opposed a timetable for withdrawal of troops, he was critical of mistakes made early in the conflict, called for the increased involvement of non-military U.S. agencies and the establishment of "benchmarks" leading towards eventual troop withdrawal. Ward was critical of Republican leadership for straying from traditional conservative principles of limited government and for failures on energy and economic policy, going to so far as to eschew endorsements from prominent Republicans. He pledged to work towards a balanced budget and stated that he would place high priority in Congress on delivering transportation funding for Colorado.

Ultimately, Ward raised a total of about $100,000 for his campaign and placed fourth among the contenders for the Republican nomination with roughly 12 percent of the vote; he conceded the race to Coffman early on the night of the primary and expressed support for the fellow Iraq veteran.

Following his defeat, Ward planned to return to his real estate and development business. His retirement from the legislature created an open seat sought by Republican Lauri Clapp and Democrat Linda Newell, a race that became one of Colorado's closest races in 2008, with less than one percent of votes separating the two.
