= Richard Champion =

Richard Champion may refer to:

- Richard Champion (footballer) (born 1968), Australian rules footballer
- Richard Champion (politician), member of the Colorado House of Representatives
- Richard Champion of Bristol (1743–1791), English merchant and porcelain manufacturer

== See also ==
- Richard Champion de Crespigny, Australian pilot
