= Robert Bowen =

Robert Bowen may refer to:

- Robert Bowen (politician) (born 1948), Colorado state legislator
- Robert O. Bowen (1920–2003), American novelist and essayist
- Robert Sidney Bowen (1900–1977), World War I aviator, journalist and author
- Rob Bowen (born 1981), American baseball player
- Rufus Bowen (Robert Edward Bowen, 1947–1978), American professor of mathematics
