= CCV =

CCV may stand for:

== In general ==
- 205 (number), CCV in Roman numerals
- AD 205 (CCV), a year in the Common Era

== People ==
- Cameron Carter-Vickers (born 1997), a British-American soccer player

== Places ==
- Cambodian Cultural Village (CCV), a theme park and museum in Siem Reap, Cambodia

== Groups, organizations, companies ==
- Canberra Community Voters, a political party in the Australian Capital Territory
- Cave Conservancy of the Virginias, an American specialized land trust
- Central California Valley Hydra (CCV Hydra), an American soccer team
- Christ's Church of the Valley, an Evangelical Christian megachurch in Peoria, Arizona
- Colorado Conservation Voters, an environmental watchdog organization
- Community College of Vermont, an American educational institution
- Cooperstown and Charlotte Valley Railroad, a heritage railroad in New York, USA
- Country Club of Virginia, a private club near Richmond, Virginia, USA

== Arts, entertainment, media ==
- SABC 1, a South African television network, formerly known as CCV (Contemporary Community Values).
- Chekka Chivantha Vaanam (2018), a Tamil film directed by Mani Ratnam.

== Transportation, vehicular ==
- Chrysler CCV (Composite Concept Vehicle), a Chrysler concept car
- Control configured vehicle, an aircraft with Fly-by-wire flight controls
- YF-16 CCV, a variant of the F-16 Fighting Falcon
- Crank Case Ventilation, or CVS, a ventilation system that removes unwanted gases from the crankcase of an internal combustion engine.
- Crew Carrying Vehicle, the older version of CalFire's Emergency Crew Transport (ECT)

== Other uses ==
- Card Code Verification, a security feature for credit or debit card transactions
- Clathrin-Coated Vesicles, a part of mammalian and plant endocytic pathway
- Common couple violence, a form of domestic abuse
- Cycloconverter, a type of motor controller

== See also ==
- C2V
- 2CV
- CV (disambiguation)
