= Senator Kagan =

Senator Kagan may refer to:

- Cheryl Kagan (born 1961), Maryland State Senate
- Daniel Kagan (born 1953), Colorado State Senate
