= Heritage High School (Colorado) =

Public school in Colorado, United States

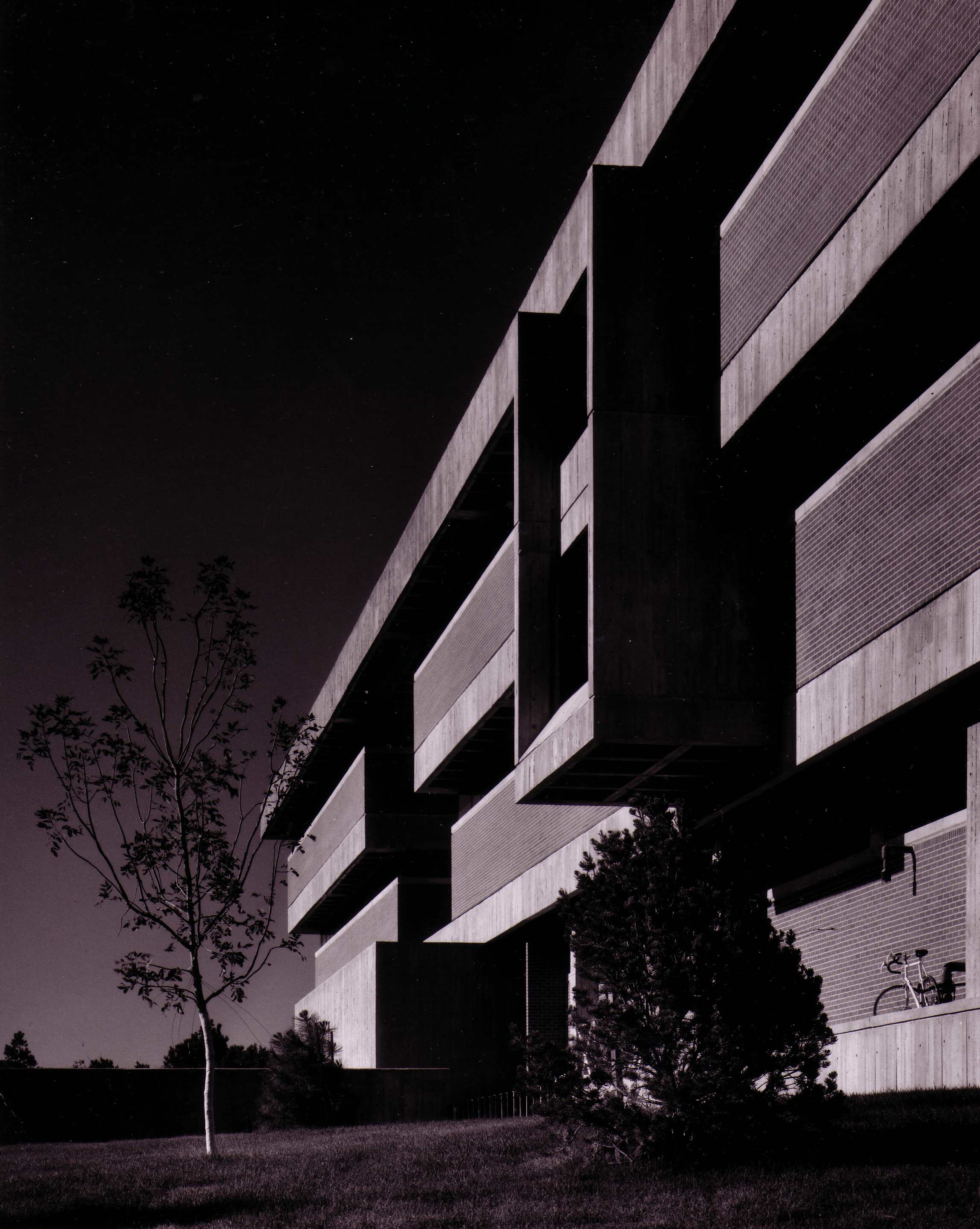

Location
- 1401 West Geddes Avenue; Littleton, Colorado 80120; United States; 39°35′14″N 105°00′13″W

Information
- Type: Free public
- Motto: Primus Inter Pares
- Established: 1972 (54 years ago)
- School district: Littleton Public Schools
- CEEB code: 060929
- Principal: Stacey Riendeau
- Teaching staff: 79.92 (FTE)
- Grades: 9–12
- Enrollment: 1,746 (2023–2024)
- Student to teacher ratio: 21.85
- Campus size: ~5 acres (20,000 m^{2})
- Campus type: Suburban
- Colors: Scarlet and Dark Blue
- Athletics conference: Continental League 5A
- Mascot: Eagle
- Rivals: Arapahoe High School, Littleton High School
- Newspaper: The Pioneer
- Yearbook: The Eyrie
- Website: www.littletonpublicschools.net/o/heritage

Heritage High School is a public school located in Littleton, Colorado, United States. It was established in 1972 as the last of three high schools in the Littleton Public Schools system. It was rated by Newsweek magazine as one of the top 200 high schools in the US in 2010, and the Denver-based 5280 magazine acknowledged Heritage High School as one of the best schools in the Denver area. The school colors are scarlet and dark blue. The mascot is the bald eagle.

== History ==
Established in 1972, Heritage is the newest of the three high schools within Littleton Public Schools. The other two are Littleton High School (opened in its present location in 1956) and Arapahoe High School (established in 1964).

In 2006, the Heritage High School Community Relations Committee sent a delegation to Sierra Leone to explore how the school could aid the country. Over three years, the school raised $60,000 to start a school, Heritage of Kabala, in Kabala, Sierra Leone. The school opened in 2009 and closed in 2022. The money raised for the school went to a clinic to improve the health of the community.

== Attendance boundary ==
Its boundary includes the portion of the Columbine census-designated place in Arapahoe County.

== Demographics ==
The demographic breakdown of the 1,748 students attending in the 2024-2025 school year:

- American Indian/Alaska Native: 0.11%
- Asian: 2.12%
- Native Hawaiian/Pacific Islander: 0.06%
- Hispanic: 13.73%
- Black: 0.8%
- White: 79.41%
- Two or more races: 3.78%

(Percentages may not add to 100% due to rounding)

== Campus ==
=== Location ===
Heritage High School is located 12 miles (19 km) south of downtown Denver in Littleton, Colorado. It is two miles north of highway C-470 between South Broadway and Santa Fe Avenue. It is located at a latitude of N. 39 degrees 35' 13.685" and a longitude of W. 105 degrees 0.0625".

=== Building ===
- The school contains 230,500 square feet (21,410 m^{2}) divided between three levels.
- The theatre seats 735 people and the main gymnasium seats a bit less.
- The library (also known as the Integrated Learning Center, ILC) is located on the first floor near a study area and art departments. It includes two computer labs as well as 12 computer workstations for student use.
- Every floor has an interdisciplinary faculty office adjacent to the department classrooms and resource centers.
- The school has two lecture halls located on the second and third floors. These lecture halls accommodate approximately 100 people for large meetings or presentations.
- The student store, located in the Student Center, is maintained and run by students involved in the Distributive Education Clubs of America (DECA).
- In addition to the computer lab in the technology area, the school also houses two more computer labs within the business department.
- In addition to the main gymnasium, the school also houses an auxiliary gym, a weight room, a climbing wall, an indoor turf room a fitness center and an indoor pool. Outside the school are four tennis courts, a turf football field, an all-weather track, a soccer field, and a baseball field.
- The school's practice fields total approximately 500,000 square feet (46,000 m^{2}).
- Remodeling during the summers of 2005 and 2006, updated departmental offices, improved the school's HVAC system, new fire and security systems, added water sprinklers, moved the library to the first floor, remodeled the entire business department, added new varsity lockers rooms above the existing west locker room, added an auxiliary gym, updated existing locker rooms, remodeled the administrative and counseling offices, updated all restrooms, and replaced lockers throughout the building. The cost of the remodel was approximately $14.5 million.
- During the summer of 2024 the school upgraded the main gym HVAC system, expansive lighting upgrades, upgraded the irrigation systems on the grass fields, upgraded theater lights, and various restroom remodels.

== Notable alumni ==
- Daniel Baer, former U.S. Ambassador to the Organization for Security and Co-operation in Europe
- Danny Dietz, Navy SEAL, Operation Redwings, documented in book and film Lone Survivor
- Terrance Ferguson, football player
- Nate Field, former MLB player (Kansas City Royals, Colorado Rockies, Florida Marlins)
- Laura Fraser, journalist, New York Times-bestselling author of An Italian Affair and other books
- Luke French, MLB player for the Detroit Tigers
- April Heinrichs, United States Soccer Development Director for Women's Soccer
- Cody Melphy, player for the United States national rugby sevens team and competitor in the 2020 Summer Olympics
- David Miller, operatic tenor and member of Il Divo
- Janice Min, former editor of Us Weekly and editorial director of The Hollywood Reporter
- Marc Munford, NFL player
- Tom Rouen, former NFL punter Denver Broncos
- Eli Saslow, writer for The Washington Post and winner of a Pulitzer Prize in 2014
- Steve Spangler, television personality, author and science teacher
- Matt Stone, co-creator of South Park
