= Stella Garza-Hicks =

American politician (born 1953)

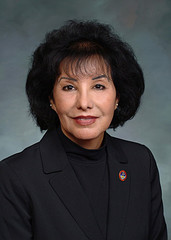
- Garza-Hicks in 2008

Member of the Colorado House of Representatives from the 17th district
- In office January 10, 2007 – January 7, 2009
- Preceded by: Mark Cloer
- Succeeded by: Dennis Apuan

Personal details
- Born: 1953 (age 72–73) Kress, Texas, U.S.
- Party: Republican
- Spouse: Ray
- Profession: Cosmetologist, Salesperson

Stella Garza-Hicks (born 1953) is a former Republican legislator in the U.S. state of Colorado.

A former cosmetologist and salesperson, Garza-Hicks became active in Republican Party activism in Colorado Springs, Colorado and rose to become a district chairperson and campaign manager for local candidates. A legislative aide to Rep. Mark Cloer, Garza-Hicks was appointed to Cloer's seat in the Colorado House of Representatives when he resigned unexpectedly in 2006.

As a legislator, Garza-Hicks represented House District 17, which included southern Colorado Springs and the Fort Carson military base. She served one term in office, during which she look largely mainstream Republican positions and sponsored relatively little legislation. She did not stand for re-election in 2008 but remains involved in Colorado Republican Party politics.

== Biography ==
Born in Kress, Texas, Garza-Hicks dropped out of high school in the ninth grade to become a cosmetologist, moving to Colorado in the 1970s with her first husband, a soldier stationed at Fort Carson. After divorcing her first husband, whom she describes as an alcoholic, Hicks remarried; she has four children —Lisa, Frank, Jestifer, and Kelly — through ex husband but they were later adopted by her current husband Ray Hicks, and worked as a vacuum cleaner salesperson before leaving work to become a homemaker.

Garza-Hicks became involved in politics after a conversation with former state representative Barbara Phillips. An active member of the El Paso County, Colorado Republican Party, Garza-Hicks belongs to the El Paso County Republican Women's Club, the Pikes Peak Republican Club, the Pikes Peak Firearms Coalition, the National Rifle Association of America, and is a legislative member of the Civil Air Patrol. She has managed the political campaigns of Harrison District 2 School Board member Linda Pugh and Colorado State Representative Mark Cloer, in addition to serving as Cloer's legislative aide.

== Legislative career ==
=== 2006 appointment ===
Garza-Hicks served as the Republican district chairperson for Colorado House District 17 for six years, a seat to which Rep. Mark Cloer was re-elected in the Colorado House of Representatives in 2006. However, instead of serving out what would have been his fourth term in the state legislature, Cloer resigned only a few weeks after his re-election, citing a desire to spend more time with his family. Nominated for the position by Cloer himself, Garza-Hicks was unanimously appointed to his seat by a Republican vacancy committee, and was sworn in on January 10, 2007, with the rest of the incoming legislative class. Garza-Hicks, who speaks Spanish, was one of the few Hispanic women in the Colorado legislature.

=== 2007 legislative session ===
Bills Introduced in 2007 by Rep. Garza-Hicks (for which Rep. Garza-Hicks is the primary originating sponsor)
BILL	TITLE	OUTCOME
HB07-1365	Concerning the inclusion of the Colorado Consortium for Earth and Space Science Education in the definition of a Public Employees' Retirement Association employer.	Signed by Gov. Ritter

During the 2007 legislative session, Garza-Hicks served on the House Services Committee and the House Local Government Committee.

Garza-Hicks maintained a low profile for most of her first term in the legislature, first speaking in House floor debate two months into the legislative session. After being criticized by news media for not being the primary sponsor of any legislation, she introduced a late bill to allow members of the Colorado Consortium for Earth and Space Science Education to receive state retirement benefits, as well as a nonbinding resolution honoring Colorado soldiers serving in Iraq and Afghanistan. Both were passed by the legislature; the resolution honoring fallen soldiers was marked in the General Assembly by a ceremony, including the playing of taps in the legislative chambers. Garza-Hicks also increased her co-sponsorship of legislation from co-sponsoring only one bill at the midpoint of the 2007 legislative session to co-sponsoring over 150 bills by the session's end.

For her voting record during the 2007 legislative session, Garza-Hicks earned a 64% rating from the fiscally conservative Colorado Union of Taxpayers, a 60% rating from the environmentally-oriented Colorado Conservation Voters, and a 42% rating from the American Civil Liberties Union; each rating placed Garza-Hicks near the middle of the range of Republican legislators.

Following the regular session, Garza-Hicks was appointed by Attorney General John Suthers to the state Methamphetamine Task Force, and served on the legislature's Police Officers' and Firefighters' Pension Reform Commission.

=== 2008 legislative session ===
In the 2008 session of the Colorado General Assembly, Hicks sat on the House Health and Human Services Committee, and the House Local Government Committee. She sponsored legislation to create a special license plate recognizing the U.S. Army's 4th Infantry Division, the first military unit to be honored with a special plate in Colorado. She was also a primary sponsor of the bipartisan resolution to recognize Military and Veterans Appreciation Day. Another of Garza-Hicks' bills addressed expedited extension of police wiretaps for surveillance purposes. The measure initially passed both houses of the legislature with different limits on potential extensions. After being reconciled to allow three month-long extensions of wiretaps, the bill was signed into law by Gov. Bill Ritter.

Although interest group ratings from groups including the Colorado Union of Taxpayers, Colorado Conservation Voters, and the American Civil Liberties Union again placed Garza-Hicks solidly within the main body of Republican lawmakers in Colorado, Garza-Hicks was one of only a few Republicans to publicly back a measure introduced by Speaker Andrew Romanoff to reform spending requirements in Colorado's state constitution by diverting excess revenues under TABOR to K-12 education.

Garza-Hicks announced in October 2007 that she would not seek re-election in 2008, citing health issues within her own family, but she did not rule out a future run for public office. Republicans Kit Roupe and Sheila Hicks (no relation to Garza-Hicks) declared their candidacies for the open seat, but the general election was narrowly won by progressive activist and Democrat Dennis Apuan, who defeated Roupe to win the only Democratic takeover of a Republican-held seat in the 2008 legislative elections in Colorado.

=== Later political activity ===
While a member of the legislature in 2007, Garza-Hicks was appointed to the War on Terror Fallen Heroes Memorial Commission, which was charged with selecting a design for a memorial to soldiers killed in U.S. actions in Iraq and Afghanistan. She was elected vice-chair at the commission's first meeting; however, after the chairman, former Rep. Rafael Gallegos, left the legislature, the group did not meet again, and Gallegos could not be located. In April 2009, Garza-Hicks expressed a desire that the panel continue its work, but, as vice-chair, stated that she did not have the authority to reconvene it.

In December 2009, Garza-Hicks was announced as a member of county-level leadership for Jane Norton's campaign for the U.S. Senate seat held by Michael Bennet.
