= Linda Newell =

American politician

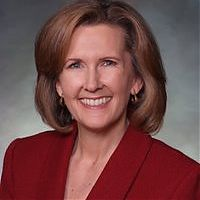

Member of the Colorado Senate from the 26th district
- In office January 7, 2009 – January 11, 2017
- Preceded by: Steve Ward
- Succeeded by: Daniel Kagan

Personal details
- Born: 1957 Oregon
- Party: Democratic
- Profession: Business Consultant in People Strategies and Human Performance

Linda Newell is a former legislator in the U.S. state of Colorado. Elected to the Colorado State Senate as a Democrat in 2008, Newell represented Senate District 26, which encompasses southern suburbs of Denver, including Littleton, Colorado. She did not seek re-election in 2016, and her term ended in January, 2017.

== Biography ==
Born in Oregon, Newell earned a bachelor's degree from the University of California, Irvine. She holds a certification as a Senior Professional in Human Resources is a Registered Organization Development Professional, and has worked as a business consultant in the fields of human resources, corporate education and workforce development. Most recently, she served as Senior Director of Learning and Development at StarTek. She is now a contract senior consultant with EPI, a human performance consulting firm.

Newell has also served on the Denver Metro Regional Workforce Development Council and the Governor's Taskforce on Workforce Development and has been a member of the National Business Executives, the Women's Professional Network, the American Society of Training and Development, the Society for Human Resource Management, and The Organizational Development Institute.

Newell has also volunteered with a number of non-profit organizations, including the American Red Cross, the Special Olympics, the March of Dimes, Season for Non-Violence, Stalking Rescue, AXIS Intervention and Training Institute, and The Conflict Center, in addition to having served as an Education Foundation Chairperson for a chapter of the American Association of University Women and the Performing Arts Chair for the Lakewood Arts Council.

Newell is also a single mother of two daughters, Kate and Brittany, and currently resides in Littleton, Colorado. As a single mother, Newell struggled in the past to pay down personal debt stemming from the Savings and Loan Crisis and to provide health insurance coverage for her family. Since being elected Newell has maintained an active role in her daughters' educations: Brittany is studying music performance at Arapahoe Community College and Kate is working towards her undergraduate degree in Diversity/Divinity at Regis University with plans to be an interfaith minister.

== Legislative career ==
=== 2008 election ===
The retirement of Sen. Steve Ward, upon his campaign for Congress, left an open seat in the historically Republican district. Newell began her campaign in July 2008, and had no opposition in the August Democratic primary. Newell focused on grassroots campaigning, with supporters knocking on over 30,000 doors and making over 10,000 phone calls to prospective voters, focusing on the city of Centennial. During her campaign, Newell focused on economic and education issues and called for increased resources for victims of domestic violence.

She faced Republican Rep. Lauri Clapp in the November 2008 general election. Clapp, who had been term-limited out of the state house in 2006, was criticized by Newell for missing multiple candidate forums; in mid-October, Newell called for her opponent to make a public appearance. Clapp's candidacy was endorsed by the Denver Post, but as of mid-October, Newell had also out-raised her opponent, taking in $33,000 to Clapp's $30,000.

Newell's race was the closest of Colorado's legislative races. Two days after the election, Newell led Clapp by 69 votes out of 59,000 cast.

With the race undecided as provisional ballots were counted, Newell attended member orientation at the state capitol, and both candidates caucused with their respective parties before the race was settled. A final count, completed two weeks after the election, gave Newell a margin of 195 votes, a margin of victory large enough to avoid an automatic recount. Newell's victory increased the Democrats' Senate majority by one seat over the previous legislative session. Looking towards representing a "swing" district, Newell began her Senate term by scheduling town hall meetings and a "listening tour" within her district.

=== 2009 legislative session ===
For the 2009 session of the Colorado General Assembly, Newell was named to seats on the Senate Health and Human Services Committee, the Senate Judiciary Committee, and the Senate Local Government and Energy Committee. She was also appointed to the Colorado Workforce Development Council.

During the 2009 session, Newell sponsored legislation recommended by the Child Welfare Action Group to require that social services case workers be trained in child welfare.
