= Miller Hudson =

American politician

Member of the Colorado House of Representatives from the 4th district
- In office January 10, 1979 – January 12, 1983
- Preceded by: Douglas Wayland
- Succeeded by: Robert Bowen

Personal details
- Party: Democratic
- Spouse: Cyn
- Children: 2
- Education: University of Maryland
- Profession: Politician

Miller Hudson is an American politician who served two terms as a member of the Colorado House of Representatives, representing the 4th district in northwest Denver. A Democrat, he was first elected in 1978 and was re-elected in 1980.

== Career ==
Hudson served in the United States Navy during the Vietnam Era and moved to Denver following his discharge. He then worked for twenty years at Mountain Bell / US West, taking early retirement. After his service in the Colorado General Assembly, he served under Mayor Federico Peña as the executive director of Denver's Department of Excise and Licenses. From 1998 to 2003, he was the executive director of the Colorado Intermountain Fixed Guideway Authority, an unsuccessful effort which sought to construct a monorail between Denver International Airport and the Eagle County Regional Airport along Interstate 70. From 2004 to 2009, Hudson was the executive director of the Colorado Association of Public Employees.

From 2016 to 2020, he was the court administrator of Colorado's Third Judicial District in Trinidad.

A prolific commentator, Hudson's opinion pieces appear frequently in the newspaper Colorado Politics and in other publications. He also works as a public policy consultant.

== Education ==
Hudson earned a B.S. in Zoology and Psychology at the University of Maryland in 1967.

== Elections ==
Hudson was elected and re-elected to the Colorado House of Representatives in 1978 and 1980. He represented the 4th district, which covered northwest Denver. He did not stand for re-election in 1982.

In 2010, Hudson was a candidate to represent District B in the Regional Transit District Board of Directors race. In the non-partisan election, he finished third among the three candidates in the race.
