= Richard Champion (politician) =

American politician

Member of the Colorado House of Representatives from the 38th district
- In office February 12, 2020 – January 13, 2021
- Preceded by: Susan Beckman
- Succeeded by: David Ortiz

Personal details
- Party: Republican
- Children: 3
- Education: University of Northern Colorado, BS
- Website: Official website Campaign website

Richard Champion is an American politician and businessman from the state of Colorado. A Republican, Champion represented the 38th district of the Colorado House of Representatives, based in western Arapahoe County, from February 12, 2020 to January 13, 2021.

== Career ==
After graduating from Arapahoe High School in 1969, Champion joined the U.S. Army Reserves, serving from 1971 until 1977. In 1974, Champion graduated with a BS from the University of Northern Colorado.

Champion is the founder of the energy company Champion Resources Inc., which he continues to operate, and has been the director of the Denver Regional Council of Governments since 2014.

== Electoral history ==
In 2016, Champion was elected mayor of Columbine Valley, a small suburb to the south of Denver, and was re-elected in 2018. Prior to being elected mayor, he was a town trustee.

In February 2020, Champion was appointed to the 38th district of the Colorado House of Representatives, which had been left vacant after incumbent Republican Susan Beckman resigned to take a job with the Trump administration. In a vote of the 55 members of the district's Republican vacancy committee, Champion received 38 votes to Arapahoe County Republican Party vice chair Brenda Stokes' 17.

Champion ran for election to a full term in 2020 but lost to Democratic Party challenger David Ortiz.

== Personal life ==
Champion lives in Columbine Valley with his wife; they have three children.
