= Anne McGihon =

American attorney and politician from Colorado

Member of the Colorado House of Representatives from the 3rd district
- In office August 4, 2003 – March 27, 2009
- Preceded by: Jennifer Veiga
- Succeeded by: Daniel Kagan

Personal details
- Born: Anne Lee McGihon; June 1, 1957 (age 69) Newport, Rhode Island, U.S.
- Party: Democratic
- Education: McGill University (BA); Florida State University (MSW, JD)
- Occupation: Attorney, politician

Anne Lee McGihon (born June 1, 1957) is an American attorney, former social worker, and politician who served as a member of the Colorado House of Representatives from 2003 to 2009. A Democrat, McGihon represented House District 3, which includes south Denver.

== Early life and education ==
Born in Newport, Rhode Island, McGihon earned a bachelor's degree from McGill University in 1978, and then a master of social work degree from Florida State University in 1980. She worked as a clinical social worker in the Tampa Veterans Administration Hospital spinal cord unit before entering law school, where she graduated with a J.D., also from Florida State University, in 1984.

== Career ==
McGihon has practiced law in Florida, Washington, D.C., and Colorado. She worked at Kirkpatrick and Lockhart from 1987 to 1989, then with Holland and Hart, and The Jefferson Group before opening her own private practice, McGihon and Associates in 1993. McGihon specializes in business, litigation, and trusts and estates.

McGihon was appointed as a Representative to House District 3 of the Colorado General Assembly in 2003 until she stepped down to pursue a career opportunity in Washington, D.C. in 2009. During her time in the Colorado General Assembly, McGihon chaired the House Health and Human Services Committee, sat on the House Appropriations Committee, and was vice-chair of the Joint Legal Services Committee.

McGihon ran for a seat on the Denver City Council in 2015 but failed to qualify for the two candidate run-off general election after coming in third in the primary. McGihon served as Chair of the Colorado Commission on Uniform State Laws from January 2013 to July 2019.
