= Tommie Hill =

American gridiron football player (born 1985)

No. 78
- Position: Defensive end

Personal information
- Born: November 28, 1985 (age 40); San Diego, California
- Listed height: 6 ft 6 in (1.98 m)
- Listed weight: 245 lb (111 kg)

Career information
- High school: Centennial (CO) Arapahoe
- College: Colorado State
- NFL draft: 2009: undrafted

Career history
- New York Giants (2009)*; BC Lions (2010)*; Oakland Raiders (2011)*
- * Offseason or practice squad member only
- Stats at Pro Football Reference

Tommie Lee Hill III (born November 28, 1985) is an American former football defensive end. He was a member of the New York Giants and the Oakland Raiders of the National Football League and BC Lions of the Canadian Football League.

== Early life ==
At Arapahoe High School in Littleton, Colo., Hill was a two-time All-conference and All-state performer. He also played on the AHS basketball, and track teams he was ranked as the No. 27 weak-side defensive end in the country by Rivals.com. Injuries kept him from four games during his senior campaign. He posted 13 tackles in Arapahoe's 7-6 win over Class 5A champion Ponderosa.

== College career ==
In 2008, Hill was one of two defensive team captains, who finished his CSU career by earning New Mexico Bowl Defensive Player of the Game, started all 13 contests at his familiar right defensive end position and made 30 tackles (14 solo) and three sacks, five tackles for loss, two interceptions, two more passes broken up, one fumble recovery and a blocked kick. In 2007, as a junior, he played in all 12 games, starting nine, and established his career high with 47 tackles (26 solo); also had 5½ sacks and six tackles for loss, two pass breakups, one fumble recovery and two forced fumbles. As a sophomore, he saw playing time in all 12 games, starting four and ended season with 3 sacks. In 2005, he finished the season with 13 tackles, three for losses, in 10 games, including the Poinsettia Bowl (Dec. 22). Redshirted as a true freshman in his first year of eligibility in 2004.

== Professional career ==
=== New York Giants ===
He was signed as a free agent immediately following the 2009 NFL draft by the New York Giants. He was waived on September 4, 2010.

=== BC Lions ===
He was signed as a free agent by the BC Lions and placed on their practice roster September 21, 2010.

=== Oakland Raiders ===
On January 5, 2011, he was signed by the Oakland Raiders. He was waived by the Oakland Raiders in their final cut on September 3, 2011.
