= Gena Ozols =

American politician

Member-elect of the Colorado House of Representatives from the 3rd district
- Assuming office January 2027
- Succeeding: Meg Froelich

Personal details
- Party: Democratic
- Website: www.ozolsforhd3.com

Gena Ozols is an American politician. A member of the Democratic Party, she is the member-elect for the 3rd district of the Colorado House of Representatives. She is Veneuelan American. She is LGBTQ.
