= Daniel Kagan =

American politician from Colorado (born 1953)

The Honourable Daniel Kagan
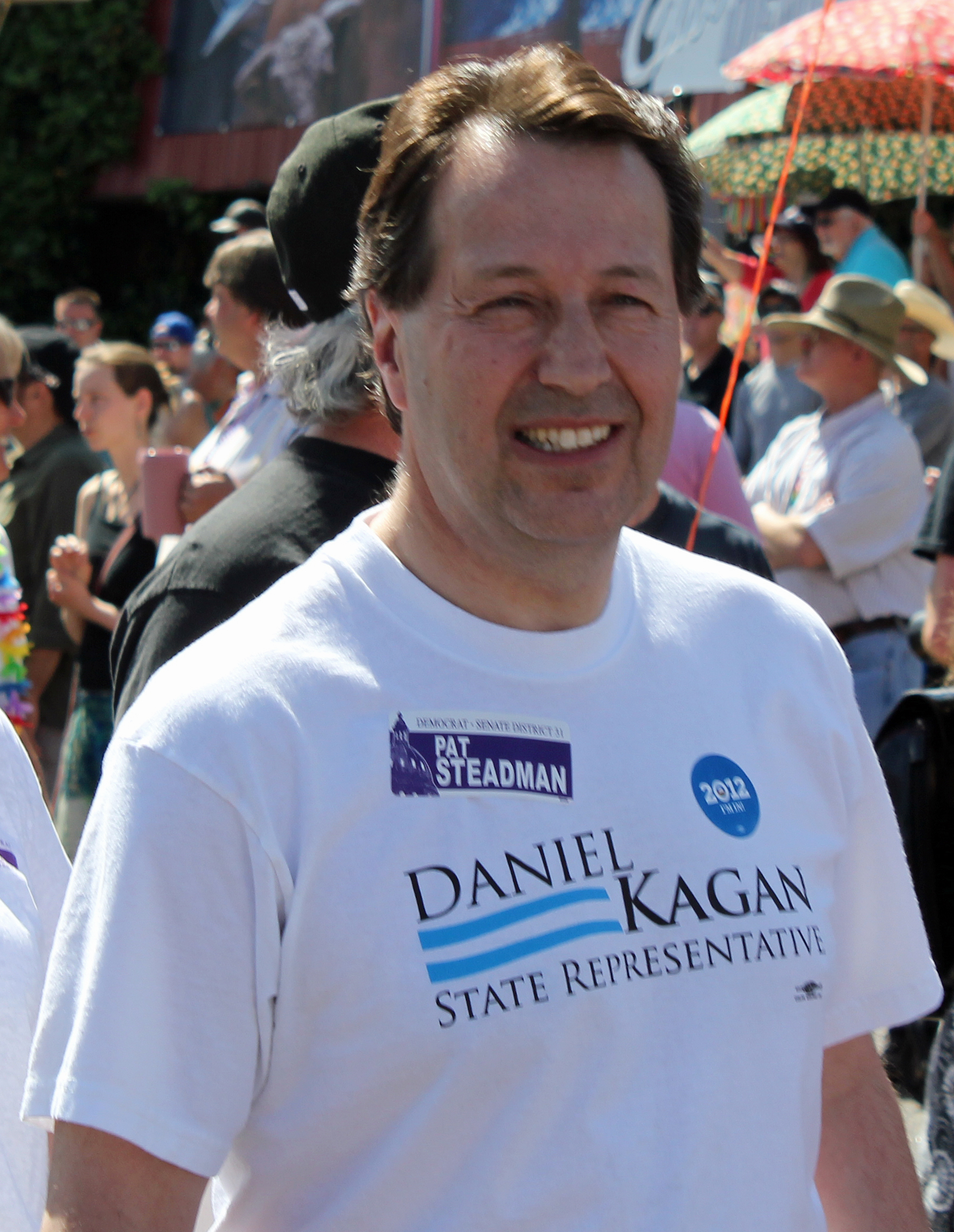

Member of the Colorado Senate from the 26th district
- In office January 11, 2017 – January 11, 2019
- Preceded by: Linda Newell
- Succeeded by: Jeff Bridges

Member of the Colorado House of Representatives from the 3rd district
- In office March 30, 2009 – January 11, 2017
- Preceded by: Anne McGihon
- Succeeded by: Jeff Bridges

Personal details
- Born: January 1953 (age 73)
- Party: Democratic
- Spouse: Faye
- Children: 3
- Parent: Joseph Kagan, Baron Kagan (father)
- Education: George Washington University; Yale Law School
- Website: www.dankagan.com

Daniel Kagan (born January 1953) is an American politician who served in the Colorado Senate from the 26th district from 2017 to 2019, and in the Colorado House of Representatives from the 3rd district from 2009 to 2017, as a member of the Democratic Party.

Kagan was born to Joseph Kagan, Baron Kagan and educated in the United States at George Washington University and Yale Law School. He gained citizenship in the United States in 1984, and worked in Washington, D.C. until he moved back to the United Kingdom with his family in 1995. He turned to the United States in 2005, and served as a delegate to the 2008 Democratic National Convention.

He was appointed to replace Representative Anne McGihon in the state house in 2009, and won reelection in the 2010, 2012, and 2014 elections and was elected to the state senate in the 2016 election. During his tenure in the state legislature he served as the chair of the Judiciary committee. Kagan resigned from the legislature in 2019 after being accused of using the women's bathroom multiple times.

== Early life and education ==
Daniel Kagan was born to Margaret and Joseph Kagan, Baron Kagan, who were Lithuanian Jews that met during the Holocaust. He was educated at Rugby School and studied political science at the University of East Anglia between 1971 and 1973. He moved to the United States in 1975. He graduated from George Washington University, which he attended from 1979 to 1984, with a bachelor's degree in economics and political science, and Yale Law School, which he attended from 1984 to 1987. He gained United States citizenship in 1984. He was admitted to the bar of the District of Columbia Court of Appeals in 1989. Kagan met Faye in 1984, married her in 1989, with whom he had three children, and lived in Washington, D.C. until they moved to the United Kingdom following the death of Kagan's father in 1995 before returning to the United States in 2005.

== Colorado legislature ==
=== Elections ===
Representative Anne McGihon announced that she would leave the Colorado House of Representatives on March 27, 2009. Kagan and eight other Democrats, including T. R. Reid, ran to be appointed to her seat by the vacancy committee. He won the appointment from the vacancy committee with thirty-five out of one hundred four votes and was sworn in on March 30. He defeated Republican nominee Christine Mastin in the 2010 election.

He defeated Republican nominee Brian Watson and Libertarian nominee David P. Jurist in the 2012 election. Watson spend $262,153 during the campaign which was the highest amount spent by any state legislature candidate in Colorado in that election cycle. He defeated Republican nominee Candice Benge in the 2014 election. Kagan ran for a seat in the Colorado Senate from the 26th district with the Democratic nomination during the 2016 election and defeated Republican nominee Nancy A. Doty. Andrew Fish, who later served as the Democratic caucus' deputy chief of staff, worked as Kagan's campaign manager in the 2016 election.

=== Tenure ===
During Kagan's tenure in the state house he served as the chair of the Judiciary committee. He served as a delegate to the Democratic National Convention for Hillary Clinton during the 2008 Democratic presidential primaries.

He gave a speech demanding for debate on a resolution seeking to expel Senator Randy Baumgardner for the sexual allegations against him. After his speech Kagan was accused of using the women's bathroom multiple times by Senators Beth Martinez Humenik and Owen Hill. He claimed that he had only used the women's bathroom once due to him having a gastrointestinal virus and the bathrooms being unmarked at the time. However, an investigation that ended in September determined that Kagan had used the women's bathroom at least three times. He announced on December 5, 2018 that he would resign on January 11, 2019, stating that the Republicans had targeted him due to the Democrats attempting to remove Republican members for sexual misconduct.

On January 5, a vacancy committee selected Jeff Bridges to replace Kagan in the state senate against three other candidates, including Iman Jodeh. Another vacancy committee selected Meg Froelich to replace Bridges in the state house.

== Later life ==
Kagan endorsed Andrew Romanoff for the Democratic nomination during the 2020 United States Senate election.

== Political positions ==
Kagan opposed legislation that required members of law enforcement to have United States citizenship. He stated that legislation punishing sanctuary cities and counties was a violation of the Fourth and Tenth amendments. He proposed legislation to repeal Colorado's adultery law. He and Representative Lori Saine sponsored legislation to require the videotaping of police interrogations in sexual assault and murder cases in order to prevent false confessions. He was among thirty-seven legislators who endorsed a letter in 2018, calling for Planned Parenthood to allow for their workers to form a union. Kagan voted in favor of repealing capital punishment in 2009.

He received an A rating from NARAL Pro-Choice America. The American Civil Liberties Union gave him a rating of 89% in 2013, 40% in 2015, 80% in 2018, and ratings of 100% in 2014, 2016, and 2017.

== Electoral history ==
2010 Colorado House of Representatives 3rd district election
Primary election
Party	Candidate	Votes	%
Democratic	Daniel Kagan (incumbent)	5,376	100.00%
Total votes		5,376	100.00%
General election
Democratic	Daniel Kagan (incumbent)	14,981	57.84%
Republican	Christine Mastin	10,919	42.16%
Total votes		25,900	100.00%

2012 Colorado House of Representatives 3rd district election
Primary election
Party	Candidate	Votes	%
Democratic	Daniel Kagan (incumbent)	2,619	100.00%
Total votes		2,619	100.00%
General election
Democratic	Daniel Kagan (incumbent)	19,610	50.76%
Republican	Brian Watson	17,194	44.51%
Libertarian	David P. Jurist	1,825	4.72%
Total votes		38,629	100.00%

2014 Colorado House of Representatives 3rd district election
Primary election
Party	Candidate	Votes	%
Democratic	Daniel Kagan (incumbent)	2,964	100.00%
Total votes		2,964	100.00%
General election
Democratic	Daniel Kagan (incumbent)	15,563	50.73%
Republican	Candice Benge	15,118	49.27%
Total votes		30,681	100.00%

2016 Colorado Senate 26th district election
Primary election
Party	Candidate	Votes	%
Democratic	Daniel Kagan	8,281	100.00%
Total votes		8,281	100.00%
General election
Democratic	Daniel Kagan	42,145	53.48%
Republican	Nancy A. Doty	36,666	46.52%
Total votes		78,811	100.00%
