= Mark Cloer =

American politician

Member of the Colorado House of Representatives from the 17th district
- In office January 10, 2001 – December 26, 2006
- Preceded by: Andy McElhany
- Succeeded by: Stella Garza-Hicks

Personal details
- Party: Republican

Mark Cloer is an American politician who served in the Colorado House of Representatives from the 17th district from 2001 to 2006.
