= Jeff Bridges (politician) =

American politician from Colorado

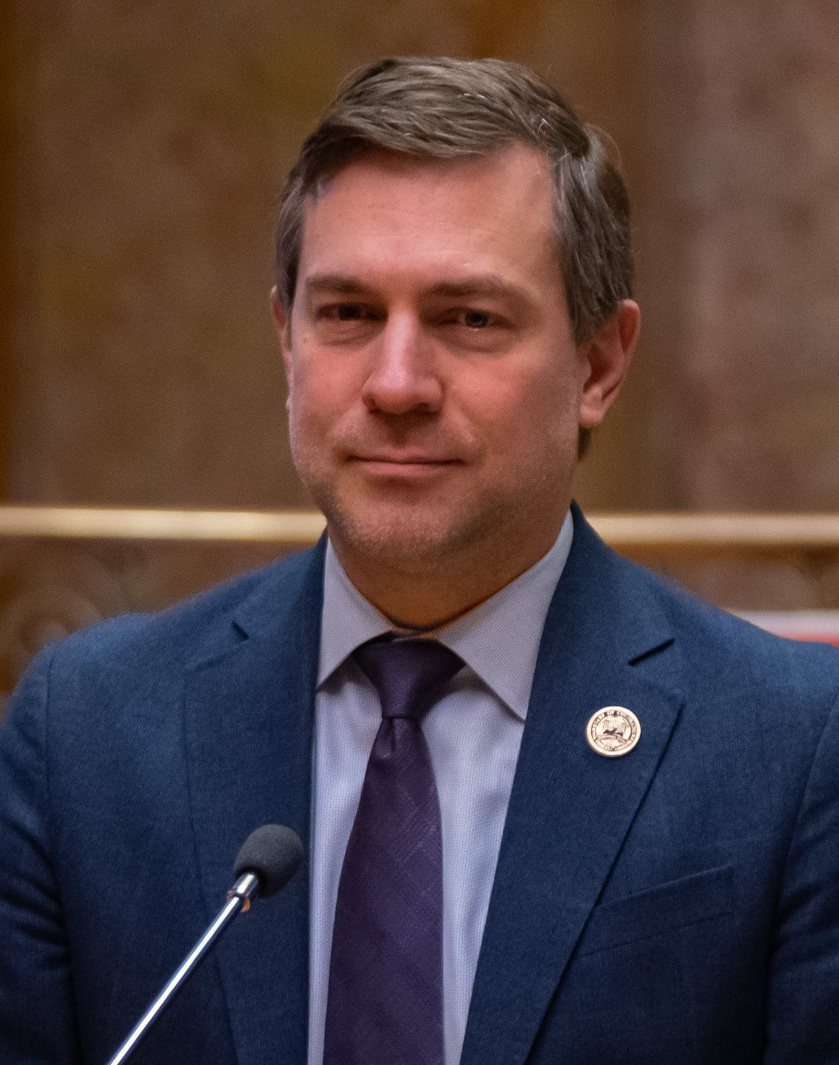
- Bridges in 2023

58th Treasurer-elect of Colorado
- Assuming office January 11, 2027
- Governor: Phil Weiser (elect)
- Succeeding: Dave Young

Member of the Colorado Senate from the 26th district
- Incumbent
- Assumed office January 14, 2019
- Preceded by: Daniel Kagan

Member of the Colorado House of Representatives from the 3rd district
- In office January 11, 2017 – January 14, 2019
- Preceded by: Daniel Kagan
- Succeeded by: Meg Froelich

Personal details
- Born: Jeffrey Kane Bridges; August 9
- Party: Democratic
- Spouse: AnnMarie Bridges
- Education: Kenyon College (BA); Harvard University (MDiv)

Jeffrey Kane Bridges (born August 9) is an American politician who is the Treasurer-elect of Colorado. He is currently serving as a member of the Colorado Senate from the 26th district. Located in Arapahoe County, the district includes parts of Aurora, Englewood, Sheridan, Greenwood Village, Cherry Hills Village, and Littleton. Bridges previously served on the Senate Education Committee and Senate Local Government Committee. He currently serves as the Chair of the Senate Appropriations Committee and sits on the Joint Budget Committee and the Legislative Interim Committee on School Finance.

== Early life and education ==
Bridges grew up in Colorado and graduated from Arapahoe High School in Centennial. He earned a Bachelor of Arts degree in political science from Kenyon College and a Master of Divinity from Harvard Divinity School.

== Career ==
Before running for the Colorado House of Representatives, Bridges worked for U.S Senator Ken Salazar. He also worked as the associate vice president of public affairs of the Union Theological Seminary.

Bridges was first elected to the Colorado House of Representatives in 2016, representing District 3. He was re-elected to the seat in 2018. In 2019, a vacancy committee elected Bridges to State Senator for District 26, after the resignation of Daniel Kagan.

Bridges currently serves as the chairman of the Joint Budget Committee, the committee responsible for drafting the state budget.

In April 2025, Bridges announced his candidacy for Colorado State Treasurer.
