= Colorado's 3rd House of Representatives district =

American legislative district

Colorado's 3rd State House of Representatives district
Representative
Meg Froelich; D–Greenwood Village
- Demographics: 63% White; 7% Black; 21% Hispanic; 3% Asian; 6% Multiracial
- Population (2021): 86,535

Colorado's 3rd House of Representatives district is one of 65 districts in the Colorado House of Representatives. It has been represented by Democrat Meg Froelich since 2019.

== Members ==
- Meg Froelich
- Gena Ozols

== Geography ==
District 3 is located in the Denver metropolitan area and covers the cities of Sheridan, Englewood and Cherry Hills Village.

== Elections ==
=== 2024 ===
2024 Colorado House of Representatives election: 3rd District
Party	Candidate	Votes	%
Democratic	Meg Froelich (incumbent)	26,049	64.03%
Republican	Mickey Neal	14,619	35.94%
Republican	Marla Fernandez (write-in)	14	0.03%
Total votes		40,682	100%
Democratic hold			
