= Littleton Public Schools =

School district in Colorado, United States

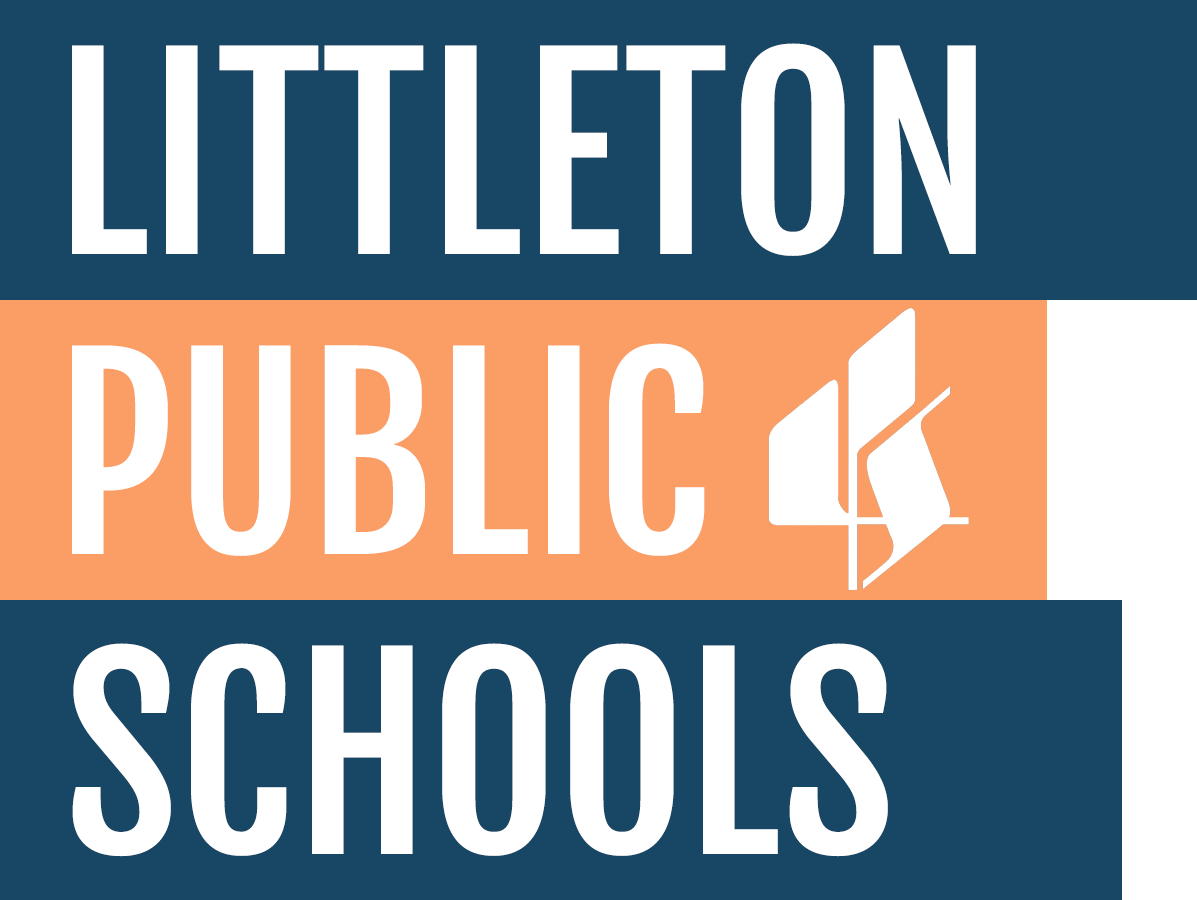

Address
- 5776 South Crocker Street Littleton, Colorado, 80120; United States
- Coordinates: 39°36′42″N 105°00′30″W

District information
- Motto: Big enough to serve you; small enough to know you
- Established: 1889; 137 years ago
- Superintendent: Dr. Todd Lambert
- NCES District ID: 0805310

Students and staff
- Enrollment: 15,445 (2012-13)
- Staff: 848.33 (on an FTE basis)
- Student–teacher ratio: 16.65

Other information
- Website: www.littletonpublicschools.net

The Arapahoe County School District No. 6, more commonly known as Littleton Public Schools (LPS), is a school district in Littleton, Colorado which serves several communities within the southern Denver metropolitan area. It is governed by a five-member Board of Education, and administered by a superintendent and six executives. Its headquarters, the Education Services Center, is located in Downtown Littleton. It is the fifteenth largest school district in Colorado. LPS operates 11 elementary schools, four middle schools, three high schools, several alternative programs, a preschool, and two charter schools.

== History ==
In 1889, Littleton Public Schools (then Littleton School District Six) was officially incorporated with the State of Colorado. It was established in the fall of 1864 when residents of the South Platte Valley voted to establish a public school district, the boundaries of which extended from what is now Sheridan Boulevard thirty miles east to the Kansas territorial line. The first president of the school district was Lewis B. Ames. In the winter of 1864, construction of the first school, a log cabin, was completed. In 1868, Littleton's second school, a frame building, was erected on the Lilley Ranch west of the Platte River. In 1873 the Rapp Avenue School was built, a one-room, brick structure with one teacher and 70 students. Littleton Public Schools then grew exponentially, experiencing the most growth during the "baby boom" era. Most LPS schools were built between 1950 and the late 1970s.

== Boundary ==
Within Arapahoe County, the district includes the majority of Littleton, all of Columbine Valley, and portions of Bow Mar, Centennial, Columbine, Englewood, and Greenwood Village.

== Schools ==
=== Preschools ===
- The Village for Early Childhood Education (preschool; students aged 3–5)

=== Elementary schools ===
- Carl Sandburg Elementary School
- Centennial Academy of Fine Arts Education
- Dr. Justina Ford Elementary
- Damon Runyon Elementary School
- Eugene Field International Baccalaureate Elementary School
- Gudy Gaskill Elementary School
- Laura Ingalls Wilder Elementary School
- Little Raven Elementary School
- Lois Lenski Elementary School
- Mark Hopkins Elementary School

=== Middle schools ===
There are four traditional middle schools in Littleton Public Schools and one alternative middle school, serving grades six through eight:

- Euclid Middle School
- Goddard Middle School
- Isaac Newton Middle School
- John Wesley Powell Middle School

=== High schools ===
- Arapahoe High School
- Heritage High School
- Littleton High School

=== Charter schools ===
- Littleton Academy Public Charter School
- Littleton Preparatory Charter School

=== Alternative programs ===
- Options Secondary Program
- Phoenix Program
- LPS Voyager
- EPIC Campus
- Next Program
- Nova Center
- RMSEL
- Transition Services

== Achievements ==
Littleton Public Schools has been Accredited with Distinction by the Colorado Department of Education ten times, most recently in 2026. All three comprehensive LPS high schools have been featured in US News' "Best High Schools", Newsweek magazine's "Top High Schools in America" and 5280 magazine's "Top High Schools in Denver." LPS has the lowest dropout rate and highest graduation rate of any school district in the Denver Metro Area. In 2013, Security Magazine ranked LPS 11th best in the nation for school security.
