= Dennis Apuan =

American politician from Colorado

Dennis Barcial Apuan

Member of the Colorado House of Representatives from the 17th district
- In office January 7, 2009 – January 12, 2011
- Preceded by: Stella Garza-Hicks
- Succeeded by: Mark H. Barker

Personal details
- Born: 30 October 1964 Manila, Philippines
- Died: 23 May 2020 (aged 55) Jacksonville, Florida
- Party: Democratic

Dennis Barcial Apuan (October 30, 1964—May 23, 2020) was an American politician and former one-term state legislator in Colorado. A Filipino-American activist, non-profit leader, and community organizer, he narrowly won election to the Colorado House of Representatives as a Democrat in 2008. He ran for re-election in 2010 but lost to his Republican opponent. He represented House District 17, which encompasses portions of southwestern Colorado Springs, Colorado and the Fort Carson military base.

== Biography ==
Born in Manila, Apuan emigrated to the United States at the age of 20. Moving to Colorado Springs from Los Angeles in 1997, he took a job at Broadmoor Community Church, where he began as a janitor but later became the church's business administrator.

He worked as a community organizer for Colorado Unity and as a regional director for the Colorado Progressive Coalition. Apuan served as vice-chairman of the El Paso County Democratic Party for four years.

He had been a member of the University of Colorado at Colorado Springs Diversity Strategic Planning Team, a program director and chairman of the Pikes Peak Justice and Peace Commission, and of the First Congregational Church in Colorado Springs.

In 2003, Apuan was among four peace activists arrested for trespassing and sentenced to perform community service for protesting nuclear weapons at Peterson Air Force Base. Apuan participated in non-violent protests against the Iraq War at the 2004 Republican National Convention in New York City and in 2007 in Colorado Springs.

Apuan died in Jacksonville, Florida on May 23, 2020 at age 55 due to complications with diabetes.

== Legislative career ==
=== 2008 election ===
Choosing to run for the state house shortly before the Democratic district assemblies in February, Apuan took a leave of absence from his position with the Colorado Progressive Coalition to seek the state house seat being vacated by retiring Republican Representative Stella Garza-Hicks.

Apuan had no opposition in the Democratic primary in August, and faced Republican Kit Roupe in the November 2008 general election. While his opponent's candidacy was endorsed by the Denver Post, Apuan was endorsed by the Colorado Springs Independent. During the final weeks of the campaign, Apuan was characterized by Roupe in a mass mail advertisement as a "violent, anti-war, anti-military protester" in reference to his anti-war protest activities, charges Apuan described as "totally false".

House District 17, covering an area southwestern Colorado Springs with a large transient population, including the Fort Carson military base, was seen as a swing district by political observers, and Apuan benefited from Democratic coattails and increased voter turnout to win the seat narrowly, raising more than $40,000 in his campaign. Apuan prevailed by a narrow margin of less than 600 votes, winning just over 51 percent of ballots cast in the race.

Roupe was the only Republican in the Colorado House of Representatives to be defeated by a Democrat in 2008. Apuan himself had difficulty casting a ballot in his own race; after first not receiving a mail-in ballot, Apuan was given an incorrect ballot at a polling place on election day. He ultimately was able to cast a provisional ballot in the correct district.

During his campaign and after his election, Apuan expressed priorities of small businesses tax cuts, fostering jobs in clean energy, and reducing health-care costs.

=== 2009 legislative session ===
For the 2009 legislative session, Apuan was named to seats on the House Finance Committee and the House Judiciary Committee. He sponsored legislation to allow organizations providing inclusive elder care to employ physicians. Although Apuan had hoped to sponsor legislation providing free college tuition to military veterans, state budget constraints led him to instead propose legislation to provide child care for military families. Another bill sponsored by Apuan would provide prospective homeowners with information about future energy bills.
