= Clint Longley =

American football player (born 1952)

No. 19, 16
- Position: Quarterback

Personal information
- Born: July 28, 1952 (age 74); Wichita Falls, Texas, U.S.
- Listed height: 6 ft 1 in (1.85 m)
- Listed weight: 193 lb (88 kg)

Career information
- High school: Littleton (Littleton, Colorado)
- College: Abilene Christian
- Supplemental draft: 1974: 1st round

Career history
- Dallas Cowboys (1974–1975); San Diego Chargers (1976); Toronto Argonauts (1977); St. Louis Cardinals (1978)*; Hamilton Tiger-Cats (1980)*
- * Offseason or practice squad member only

Awards and highlights
- Second-team Little All-American (1973)

Career NFL statistics
- Passing attempts: 68
- Passing completions: 31
- Completion percentage: 45.6%
- TD–INT: 5–4
- Passing yards: 441
- Passer rating: 67.1
- Stats at Pro Football Reference

Howard Clinton Longley Jr. (born July 28, 1952) is an American former professional football player who was a quarterback in the National Football League (NFL) with the Dallas Cowboys and San Diego Chargers. He also was a member of the Toronto Argonauts in the Canadian Football League (CFL). Longley played college football for the Abilene Christian Wildcats.

== Early life ==
After attending Littleton High School, he enrolled at Abilene Christian University without a scholarship. He was redshirted in his freshman year. In 1973 as a junior, he led the nation's small colleges in passing and total offense, completing 195 of 360 passes for 3,167 yards and 28 touchdowns, while rushing for 251 yards. He set a school record by passing for 434 yards and 4 touchdowns in a 41–7 victory against Southwest Texas State University.

Longley finished the year guiding his team to 11 straight victories and the NAIA championship. He also received Small College All-American honors and was named, along with teammate Wilbert Montgomery, to the 1973 NAIA football All Star team, whose backfield included Walter Payton. He forwent his senior season to declare for the NFL draft.

== Professional career ==
=== Dallas Cowboys ===
As a result of leaving college with eligibility still remaining to be completed (three hours away from a degree), he entered the supplemental draft in 1974, where he was selected by the Cincinnati Bengals. On July 3, he was traded to the Dallas Cowboys in exchange for a fifth round draft choice (#122-Jeff West). He was named the backup quarterback to Roger Staubach, after having a strong training camp and Craig Morton being traded to the New York Giants.

He is best remembered for his performance in a Thanksgiving Day game in 1974 against the Washington Redskins. Longley, then a rookie, came into the game for an injured Roger Staubach with the Cowboys trailing 16–3 in the third quarter, and facing elimination from the playoffs. After hitting Billy Joe Dupree for a 35-yard touchdown pass, he led the Cowboys on a 70-yard drive capped by a 1-yard Walt Garrison touchdown run. Finally, with the Cowboys behind 23–17 and with only 28 seconds left with no time outs, Longley hit Drew Pearson at the left sideline for a 50-yard hail mary pass touchdown which gave the Cowboys a dramatic 24–23 come from behind victory.

Because Longley had no expectation of playing in that game and was unprepared, Cowboys lineman Blaine Nye jokingly called his winning effort "the triumph of the uncluttered mind." The game was named the second-best in the history of Texas Stadium by ESPN in 2008.

In 1975, he started in the season finale against the New York Jets, so Staubach could rest for the playoffs. He brought back the team from a 0–14 deficit to win 31–21.

On August 30, 1976, after a training room incident in which he sucker-punched Roger Staubach during the 1976 preseason, the team suspended and eventually traded him to the San Diego Chargers along with a first round draft pick (#24-Bob Rush), in exchange for a first (#14-Steve August) and second round draft choice (#41-Terry Beeson). The Cowboys used those two picks and two other picks to eventually land the No. 2 overall pick in the 1977 draft, selecting Tony Dorsett.

=== San Diego Chargers ===
In 1976, the San Diego Chargers acquired Longley with the intention of creating a competition with Dan Fouts. He appeared in three games (one start), completing 12-for-24 passes for 130 yards, along with two touchdowns and three interceptions while being sacked seven times. He was released on September 8, 1977.

=== Toronto Argonauts ===
On September 22, 1977, Longley was signed by the Toronto Argonauts of the Canadian Football League. He played in eight games before being released.

=== St. Louis Cardinals ===
On July 5, 1978, Longley was signed as a free agent by the St. Louis Cardinals. He was cut on August 22. Longley played shortly thereafter for the minor league Shreveport Steamer during its 1979 summer season.

=== Hamilton Tiger-Cats ===
On May 24, 1980, he was signed by the Hamilton Tiger-Cats after being a year out of football. He was released on June 5.

== Staubach incident ==
Less than two years after his Thanksgiving Day heroics, Longley, under pressure from Danny White for the back-up QB role, left the Cowboys after he punched Staubach during training camp in Thousand Oaks, California. The infamous "sucker punch" occurred after a negative remark Longley made about Staubach to Cowboy teammates. Staubach was putting on his shoulder pads on the last day of training camp when Longley hit him in the head without warning and from behind causing his head to slam against a standing scale, requiring several stitches to close the wound on Staubach's face. Longley was immediately traded to the San Diego Chargers where he spent the 1976 season before being released, marking the end of his NFL career. It was reported that Longley's motivation was a desire to be traded, and that he felt that Dallas should have traded Staubach and turned the team over to him.

== Personal life ==
Longley earned his nickname the "Mad Bomber" in his rookie training camp because of incidents like one of his errant passes hitting head coach Tom Landry's coaching tower. When the NFL Network did a "Top 10 One-Hit Wonders" list that included Longley, Steve Sabol said he last heard that Longley had ended up selling carpet remnants out of the back of a van in Marfa, Texas.
