= Kathleen Conti =

American politician

Member of the Colorado House of Representatives from the 38th district
- In office January 11, 2011 – January 11. 2017
- Preceded by: Joe Rice
- Succeeded by: Susan Beckman

Personal details
- Party: Republican
- Spouse: Frank Conti
- Committees: House Finance Committee; House Local Government Committee

Kathleen Conti is a Colorado based politician (Legislator). Previously, she served as a member of the Colorado House of Representatives representing House District 38, which encompasses Greenwood Village, Bow Mar, and Littleton, Colorado as well as parts of Englewood, Centennial, Aurora, and Columbine Valley. She did not seek re-election to the State House of Representatives in 2016. Instead, she successfully ran for a seat on the Arapahoe County Board of County Commissioners. She represented District 1 on the board from January 9, 2017 to January 12, 2021.

== Legislative career ==
=== 2010 election ===
In 2010 Kathleen Conti was elected to the 68th General Assembly for House District 38 after having won 52% of the vote thereby defeating incumbent centrist Democrat Joe Rice.

=== 2011 legislative session ===
After Republican victories in 2010 brought in a Republican majority, Conti was appointed as a member of the House Local Government Committee and House Finance Committee.

=== 2012 election ===
In the 2012 General Election, Representative Conti faced Democratic challenger Donovan O'Dell. Conti was elected by a margin of 58% to 39%.

== Political positions ==
Kathleen Conti has been characterized as a conservative Republican.

Kathleen supports gay conversion therapy for LGBTQ youth in Colorado and does not believe that gay or lesbian couples should be entitled to marriage or civil union.

In 2010, Kathleen Conti wrote, "Colorado with it's [sic] vast open spaces and many wooded areas, makes a friendly environment for any type of Camp, even Terrorist Training camps." And explained that, "Of the 18 terrorist training camps in the United States Colorado is believed to have as many as 3." Colorado Bureau of Investigation have not found evidence that "terrorist Training Camps" exist in Colorado.

In July 2020, Kathleen Conti left a voicemail with the Colorado Tri-County Health Department requesting that the department not mandate mask usage during the 2020 COVID-19 pandemic. When a journalist produced a recording of Conti's voicemail, she claimed she did not recall leaving the demand with the health department. The health department proceeded with a mask mandate in order to limit disease transmission.
