= Gretchen Rydin =

American politician

Member of the Colorado House of Representatives from the 38th district
- Incumbent
- Assumed office January 8, 2025
- Preceded by: David Ortiz

Personal details
- Party: Democratic
- Education: Brigham Young University; Howard University
- Website: https://www.gretchenforcolorado.com

Gretchen Rydin is an American politician who was elected member of the Colorado House of Representatives for the 38th district in 2024.

Rydin was a member of Littleton City Council from 2021-2024. She has worked as a social worker, therapist, and addictions counselor professionally. Gretchen currently plays viola in the Denver Pops Orchestra.
