= Littleton High School (Colorado) =

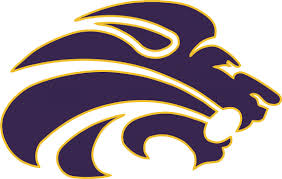

Location
- 199 East Littleton Boulevard; Littleton, Colorado 80121; United States; 39°36′50″N 104°59′08″W

Information
- Type: Public high school
- Motto: "Make a living, Make a life, Make a difference."
- Established: 1907 (119 years ago)
- School district: Littleton Public Schools
- CEEB code: 060930
- Staff: 58.88 (FTE)
- Grades: 8-12
- Enrollment: 1,192 (2023-2024)
- Student to teacher ratio: 20.24
- Colors: Purple and gold
- Athletics conference: Continental League
- Mascot: Lion
- Website: littleton.littletonpublicschools.net

Littleton High School is a public high school located in Littleton, Colorado, United States. It is a part of the Littleton Public Schools school district.

== History ==
The first Littleton High School building was finished in 1920 and initially served 225 students. In 1935, funding was acquired to construct three new wings to double the floor space and reduce the overcrowding due to the increasing number of students.

In 1956-58, the original school building was converted into Grant Junior High School. Improvements were designed by architect Alfred Watts, including a one-story cafeteria with a kitchen and six additional classrooms. An annex was added in 1958 to provide space for a music room, shop, home economics rooms, and labs. The additions of 1956-58 were built in a modern 1950s style, emphasizing larger windows and different shades of brick. In 1958, a football field was added at the east end of the site and tennis courts were constructed near the corner of Littleton Boulevard and Windermere Street. The Grant Junior High building was later converted into use by the Littleton School District as administrative offices.

The current Littleton High School, located at 199 E. Littleton Boulevard, was completed in 1956. It was designed by Earl C. Morris and built by Mead & Mount. A 1958 addition added 7,092 square feet (658.9 m^{2}) of classrooms and was designed and built by the same companies for $87,875. In 1961, 78,000 square feet (7,200 m^{2}) of new classrooms were added for $1,235,000. Earl C. Morris also designed this addition, with general contracting work completed by Weaver Construction Company. Langfur Construction Co. completed remodeling behind the stage in 1968, with designs by Bourn & Dulaney. A new swimming pool was added in 1969 for $394,369. The architect was Nixon-Brown-Brokaw-Bowen, and the contractor was Hezlep Construction Co. A new 1,200-square-foot (110 m^{2}) shop area was designed by Nixon-Brown-Brokaw-Bowen and built by Weaver Construction in 1979. The auditorium was remodeled and enlarged by 2,400 square feet (220 m^{2}) in 1985. That project went to Allred/Fisher architects and Van I. Warden general contractors. These additions more than doubled the original size of the high school. The gymnasium is one of few in the area to still have balcony seating.

In November 2015, the theater was remodeled and completed.

== Academics ==
In 1994, Tim Westerberg, the principal of Littleton High School at the time, attempted to shift the school to a performance-based graduation system rather than one based on attendance. His goal was to ensure that students graduated based on demonstrated skills and competencies rather than just time spent in class. Although he believed the system was effective, the Littleton Board of Education ultimately reversed the decision.

el_199105_westerberg.pdf

Requiem For A Reform

== Athletics ==
Athletic programs at LHS include baseball, men's and women's basketball, cross country, football, men's and women's golf, men's lacrosse, poms, men's and women's soccer, softball, swimming, men's and women's tennis, track and field, wrestling, and volleyball.

In 2005, the Littleton men's track team placed second overall at the 5A state championship. They were led by 4 × 100 m relay gold medalists Nate Yorks and Shane Cronin, who won individual silver medals, second only to 100m/200m state record holder, Jeremy Dodson. Yorks finished in second place in the 100m dash and 200m dash, while Cronin finished in second place in the 400m dash and 4 × 400 m relay. Yorks and Cronin ran splits of 45.9 seconds and 47.0 seconds, breaking the Littleton High School 100m dash, 200m dash, 400m dash, and 4 × 100 m relay records.

Team State Championships:

Football 1959

Ice Hockey 1976

Girls Tennis 1977

Boys Basketball 1960 1987 1989

Boys Swimming and Diving 1976 1979 1980 1981 1982 1983 1984

Girls Swimming and Diving 1988 1990 1992 1993 2000

Spirit (Cheerleading) 1990 (tie) 1992 1993 1994 1996 1997 1999

Girls Track and Field 5A 2009

Boys Track and Field 5A 2009

Individual State Championships:

CHSAA Individual Champions Database | CHSAANow.com

== Performing arts ==
Littleton High school has a long history of exceptional performing arts in theater, band, and vocal music since its inception in 1907.

The drama program presents several productions each year, with auditions open to all students. These include a fall play and a winter musical. Students may audition for or work on crews for student-directed plays throughout the year.

The theater has been home to hundreds of productions since the school's inception more than one hundred years ago, including well known works such as Camelot, Taming of the Shrew, Oklahoma, Seussical, The Mystery of Edwin Drood, The Laramie Project, and All in the Timing. In the spring of 2008, the school housed the original play The Cliff's Edge, written, acted, and directed by the students of the senior Theater Company class of 2008, and End Process, written and directed by the 2009 senior Theater Company (auditions were open to anyone). Many of these performances have been recognized and reviewed by Colorado Backstage, a web theater critic site for professional productions across the state. In 2012, the theater department produced Legally Blonde: The Musical, which received ten nominations in the Bobby G Awards. In 2022, the theater department produced Into the Woods, which was nominated for four Bobby G Awards and won one for Best Directing.

The LHS Instrumental Music Department consists of two concert bands (Wind Ensemble/Symphonic Band), one strings-only class (Chamber Orchestra), and a jazz band. The department also includes a marching band, pit orchestra for musicals, and several smaller ensembles for various performances. The marching band competes in the 4A bracket under the direction of Don Emmons, and has performed shows such as Locomotion, Midnight in Transylvania, Medusa, The Pirates of Penzance, and Machines. In 2022, the marching band scored an 80.85 with the show Words of Wisdom, loosely based on Let It Be by The Beatles, and was the first in the Metro Denver area to skip state quarterfinals. This is the current highest score held by the high school.

The LHS Vocal Music Department consists of one non-audition ensemble: Women's Ensemble; and four audition-only ensembles: Concert Choir, Troubadours, Syrens, and LHS Singers. Both the Concert Choir and Troubadours have performed in many distinguished locations, such as the King Center at Auraria Campus and Boettcher Concert Hall. The Vocal Jazz group, under the direction of Jim Farrell, is known throughout the state as an excellent high school jazz group, consistently winning state jazz competitions, the Chaparral High School High Plains Jazz Festival, UNC/Greeley Jazz Festival, and the Arapahoe County School District jazz showcase. At least one LHS student has qualified for the Colorado All State Jazz Group every year, and this is the only high school to do so since the creation of the Colorado ASJ program. The vocal department is under the direction of Aimee Taylor.

The LHS Vocal Music Department and Instrumental Music Department offer students the opportunity to attend national and international music trips every three years. A few places they have traveled to include Germany and Hawaii. These trips allow students to perform in famous churches and buildings while getting to tour the respective state and country.

== International Baccalaureate ==
In 1997, Littleton High School applied to become an International Baccalaureate Diploma Program School. After approval, the first class of 14 students graduated in 1999 and had a 100% passing rate: all students earned their IB Diploma.

== Demographics ==
The demographic breakdown of the 1,187 students attending in the 2024-2025 school year:

- American Indian/Alaska Native: 0.42%
- Asian: 2.61%
- Native Hawaiian/Pacific Islander: N/A
- Hispanic: 33.53%
- Black: 2.11%
- White: 56.02%
- Two or more races: 5.31%

== Notable alumni ==
- Molly Burnett, singer and actress on Days of Our Lives
- Brad Corrigan, rock drummer, guitarist, and singer for the band Dispatch
- Kaela Edwards, track & field athlete who competes for Adidas
- Dave Grusin, composer, arranger and pianist, winner of Grammy and Academy awards
- Don Grusin, jazz keyboardist, composer, and record producer, winner of Grammy awards
- Bob Holme, ski jumper, competed for USA at the 1992 and 1994 Winter Olympics, and the 1993 World Championships
- Tim T. Kelly, media executive, film producer, and conservationist; President and CEO of the National Geographic Global Media group and of National Geographic Ventures
- Clint Longley, former NFL quarterback
- Lynne Taylor-Corbett, dancer and Broadway choreographer, Tony award nominee
- Brooks Thompson, former NBA player with the Orlando Magic, Utah Jazz, Denver Nuggets, Phoenix Suns and New York Knicks; head NCAA basketball coach of University of Texas, San Antonio
