= Colorado's 26th Senate district =

American legislative district

Colorado's 26th State Senate district
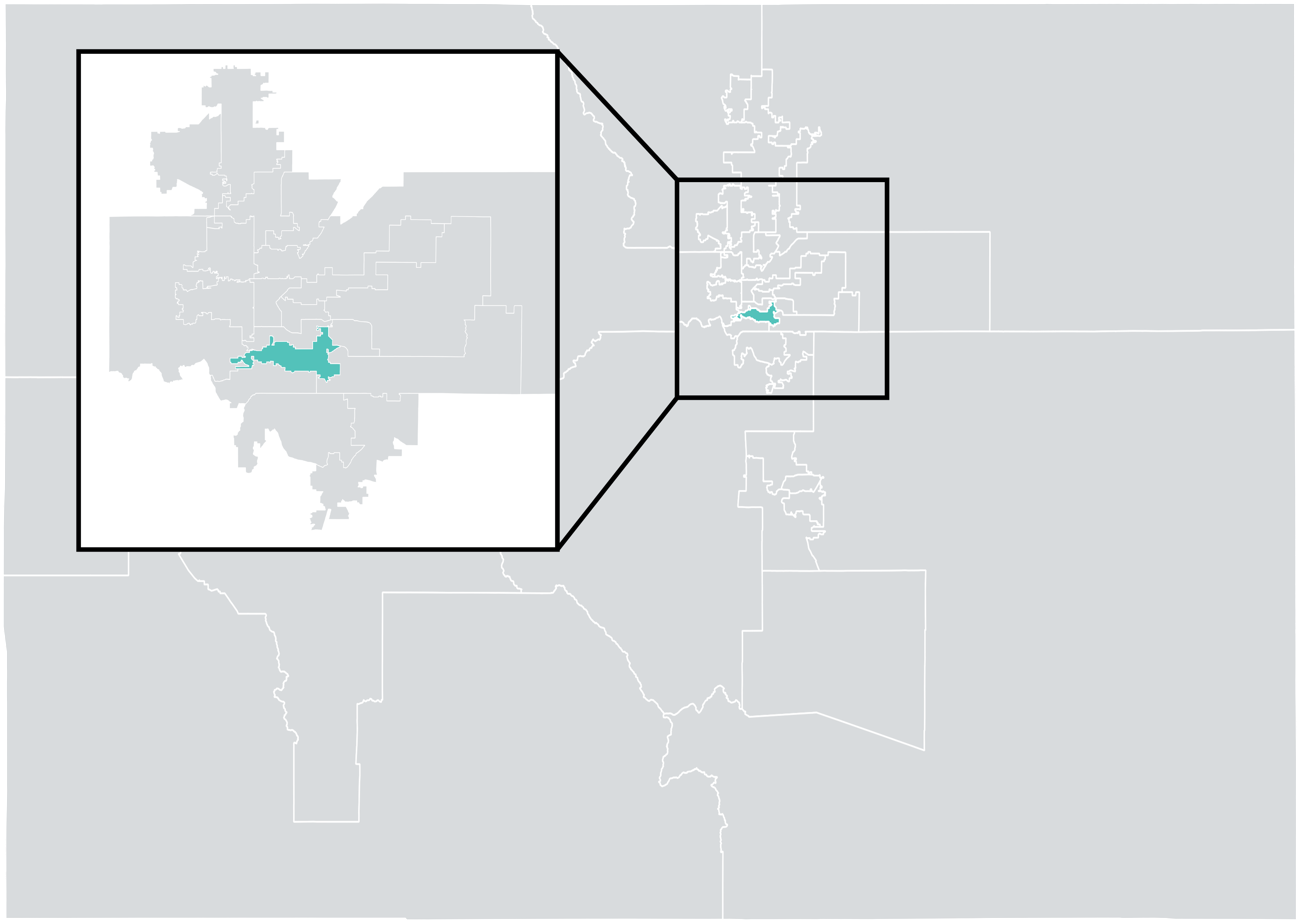
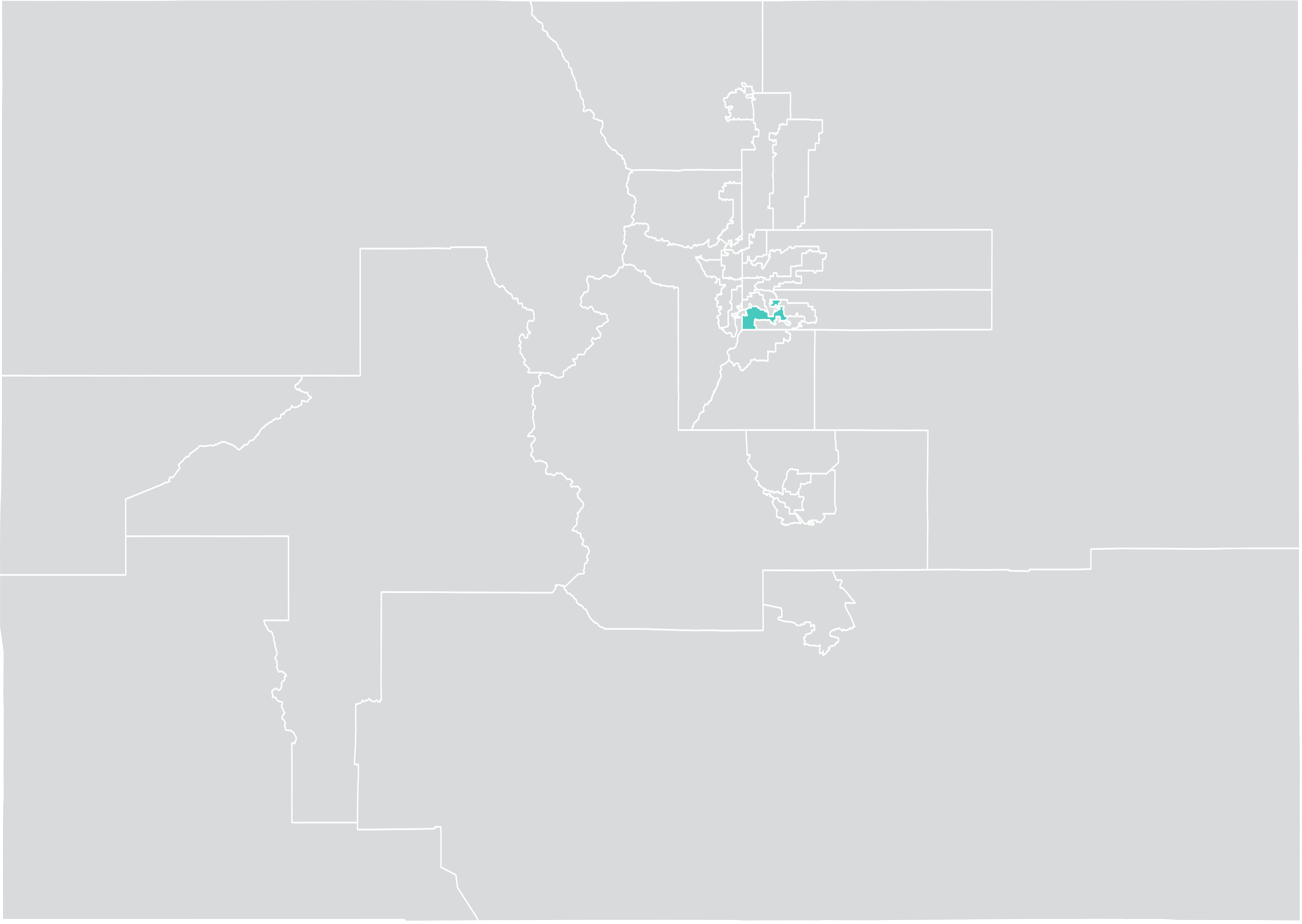
Senator
Jeff Bridges; D–Greenwood Village
- Registration: 31.0% Democratic; 17.9% Republican; 48.7% No party preference
- Demographics: 70% White; 8% Black; 15% Hispanic; 4% Asian; 3% Other
- Population (2018): 161,747
- Registered voters: 113,956

Colorado's 26th Senate district is one of 35 districts in the Colorado Senate. It has been represented by Democrat Jeff Bridges since 2019, following the resignation of fellow Democrat Daniel Kagan.

== Geography ==
District 26 covers many of Denver's immediate southern suburbs in Arapahoe County, including Cherry Hills Village, Englewood, Greenwood Village, Sheridan, Columbine Valley, most of Littleton, and a small part of western Aurora.

The district is split between Colorado's 1st and 6th congressional districts, and overlaps with the 3rd, 38th, 40th, and 41st districts of the Colorado House of Representatives.

== Recent election results ==
Colorado state senators are elected to staggered four-year terms; under normal circumstances, the 26th district holds elections in presidential years.

=== 2020 ===
In December 2018, Senator Daniel Kagan announced he would resign following odd allegations that he had repeatedly used a women's bathroom in the state capitol. State Rep. Jeff Bridges was appointed to replace him in January 2019 and won a full term in 2020.

2020 Colorado State Senate election, District 26
Party	Candidate	Votes	%
Democratic	Jeff Bridges (incumbent)	54,275	60.6
Republican	Bob Roth	32,984	36.8
Libertarian	Marc Solomon	2,366	2.6
Total votes		89,625	100

=== 2016 ===
2016 Colorado State Senate election, District 26
Party	Candidate	Votes	%
Democratic	Daniel Kagan	42,145	53.5
Republican	Nancy Doty	36,666	46.5
Total votes		78,811	100
Democratic hold			

=== 2012 ===
2012 Colorado State Senate election, District 26
Party	Candidate	Votes	%
Democratic	Linda Newell (incumbent)	38,744	54.1
Republican	Francine Bigelow	32,890	45.9
Total votes		71,634	100
Democratic hold			

=== Federal and statewide results ===
Year	Office	Results
2020	President	Biden 62.9 – 34.3%
2018	Governor	Polis 58.5 – 38.2%
2016	President	Clinton 54.1 – 37.1%
2014	Senate	Udall 49.3 – 45.5%
2014	Governor	Hickenlooper 54.3 – 41.8%
2012	President	Obama 53.4 – 44.3%
