= David Ortiz (politician) =

American politician

David Daniel Ortiz

Member of the Colorado House of Representatives from the 38th district
- In office January 13, 2021 – January 8, 2025
- Preceded by: Richard Champion
- Succeeded by: Gretchen Rydin

Personal details
- Born: May 25, 1982 (age 44) Rapid City, South Dakota, U.S.
- Party: Democratic
- Education: St. Thomas University (BA)
- Website: www.davidortizcolorado.com

Military service
- Allegiance: United States
- Branch/service: United States Army

David Ortiz is a Democratic former member of Colorado State House of Representatives. Ortiz was the representative for Colorado's 38th House District, which is situated in western Arapahoe County and includes the community of Columbine Valley as well as most of the town of Littleton and the Southglenn neighborhood of Centennial.

Ortiz sat on both the House Public & Behavioral Health & Human Services Committee and the Health & Insurance Committee. He is the first bisexual legislator and the first wheelchair user to serve in the chamber.

== Background ==
In 2012, Ortiz survived a helicopter crash while serving as a pilot in the U.S. Army in Afghanistan. The accident left him paralyzed from the waist down. Following his recovery at Craig Hospital, Ortiz worked as a lobbyist for veterans and behavioral health issues through the United Veterans Committee.

== Colorado State Legislature ==
Ortiz was elected to the state House in 2020, defeating newly appointed Republican Representative Richard Champion by a margin of 55.57% to 44.43%. After a 400-vote loss in the district two years prior, HD38 was a major target for state Democrats during the 2020 cycle.

During the 2021 legislative session, Ortiz was the prime sponsor for 24 bills, more than any other freshman House representative. These sponsored bills included HB21-1110, which adopted the public accessibility standards established in the Americans with Disabilities Act into Colorado state law.

In October 2023, Ortiz announced that he would not seek re-election to a third term in 2024, endorsing Littleton mayor pro tem Gretchen Rydin as his successor.
