= Susan Beckman =

American politician

Member of the Colorado House of Representatives from the 38th district
- In office January 11, 2017 – January 17, 2020
- Preceded by: Kathleen Conti
- Succeeded by: Richard Champion

Personal details
- Party: Republican
- Spouse: Bruce
- Education: Colorado State University Pueblo
- Website: electsusanbeckman.com

Susan Beckman is a former state representative from Arapahoe County, Colorado. A Republican, Beckman represented Colorado House of Representatives District 38, which encompasses the communities of Bow Mar, Centennial, Columbine, Columbine Valley, and Littleton, in Arapahoe County, Colorado.

== Education ==
Beckman earned a degree in communications from Colorado State University Pueblo. Beckman earned a certificate in state and local government from Harvard Kennedy School of Executive Education.

== Career ==
In 1999, Beckman became a councilwoman on the Littleton City Council. She served until 2001 when she became a commissioner on the Arapahoe County Board of County Commissioners until 2013.

On November 8, 2016, Beckman won election to become a member of Colorado House of Representatives for District 38. Beckman defeated Robert E. Bowen with 57.83% of the votes. On November 6, 2018, as an incumbent, Beckman won the election and continued serving District 38. Beckman defeated Chris Kolker with 50.39% of the votes and a margin of 374 votes out of 47,954 cast.

In January 2019, Rep. Beckman announced that she was running for Colorado Republican Party chair in the state GOP's upcoming reorganization and intended to resign her House District 38 seat at the end of the General Assembly's 120-day session if she wins the party election.

In January 2020, Rep. Beckman resigned her Colorado State Representative seat effective immediately to take a job with the Trump administration. She announced her move on the House floor but did not specify what her new job will be.

== Personal life ==
Beckman's husband is Bruce. They have two children.
