= Meg Froelich =

American politician from Colorado

Member of the Colorado House of Representatives from the 3rd district
- In office January 14, 2019 – January 11, 2027
- Preceded by: Jeff Bridges
- Succeeded by: Gena Ozols (elect)

Personal details
- Born: Houston, Texas, U.S.
- Party: Democratic
- Education: Bryn Mawr College (BA); University of Michigan (MA)

Meg M. Froelich is an American politician serving as a member of the Colorado House of Representatives from the 3rd district, which includes [[Englewood, Colorado], [Sheridan, Colorado], and [Denver, Colorado]]. Froelich assumed office on January 14, 2019.

== Early life and education ==
Froelich was born in Texas. She lived overseas as a child in Japan, Australia and Malaysia. Her family moved to New York City in High School. She earned a Bachelor of Arts degree in history from Bryn Mawr College, followed by Master of Arts in history from the University of Michigan. She earned a teaching credential in secondary education from the Dominican University of California.

== Career ==
Prior to entering politics, Froelich worked as a producer for CBS News, A&E Networks, and PBS. Froelich was the co-producer, writer, and director of Strong Sisters, a documentary about female legislators in Colorado. She served as director of the Colorado chapter of NARAL Pro-Choice America and executive director of the Colorado Democratic Party.

After incumbent Democrat Jeff Bridges was selected to fill a vacancy in the Colorado Senate, Froelich was appointed to replace him, becoming the member of Colorado House of Representatives for District 3.

Froelich was the lead sponsor of several bills which preserved Reproductive Rights in Colorado. Including a bill during the 2021 session of the Colorado General Assembly that established a system to regulate surrogacy in the state. Her bill, HB 21-1022, would set criteria for contracts used to engage surrogate mothers for intended parents..

== Elections ==
=== 2020 ===
Froelich ran in district 3 unopposed in the Democratic primary. In the general election, she defeated Republican Dean Titterington with 59.1% of the vote.
