= Arapahoe High School (Colorado) =

American high school in Colorado

Location
- 2201 East Dry Creek Road; Centennial, Colorado 80122; United States; 39°34′53″N 104°57′45″W

Information
- School type: Public high school
- Established: 1964 (62 years ago)
- School district: Littleton 6
- CEEB code: 060928
- NCES School ID: 080531000873
- Principal: Natalie Pramenko
- Teaching staff: 78.86 (on an FTE basis)
- Grades: 9–12
- Enrollment: 1,781 (2023–2024)
- Student to teacher ratio: 22.58
- Colors: Black and old gold
- Athletics conference: CHSAA
- Mascot: Warriors
- Website: www.littletonpublicschools.net/o/arapahoe

Arapahoe High School is a public high school in Centennial, Colorado, United States. Located in a suburb of Denver, it is the flagship of the Littleton Public Schools District as the largest of three high schools, with an enrollment of 1,820 students. It has been designated a Blue Ribbon School by the U.S. Department of Education.

The school is known for its affiliation with the Arapaho Tribe of the Wind River Reservation, Wyoming.

== History ==
=== Relationship with Arapaho Nation ===
On September 17, 1993, the school began a relationship with the Arapaho Nation from the Wind River Indian Reservation in Wyoming. The relationship strives to promote awareness and exchange between cultures.

The original "Arapahoe Warrior" logo was designed by Wilbur Antelope, a Northern Arapaho artist, and the logo has been endorsed by the Arapaho Nation for school activities.

On December 9, 1994, the school gymnasium was renamed in honor of Arapaho Elder Anthony Sitting Eagle, who was one of the primary tribal elders that principal Ronald Booth met with in establishing the school's relationship with the Arapaho Nation.

Every other year the school hosts "Arapahoe Day" in which members of the Arapaho Nation travel from the reservation to share in tribal customs with the students. On years in which the school does not host Arapaho Nation members, select students visit the Wind River Indian Reservation in Riverton, Wyoming.

=== 2013 shooting ===
On December 13, 2013, a shooting occurred at the school. The gunman, an 18-year-old student who was identified as Karl Pierson, entered the school armed with a 12-gauge Stevens Model 320 pump-action shotgun, a machete, three Molotov cocktails, and 125 rounds of ammunition. He requested to see the school librarian, who was also the coach of the school debate team. The shooter's demotion on the team was a contributing motive to the shooting. One student, 17-year-old Claire Davis was shot in the head and died eight days later. Pierson attempted to start a fire with one of the devices he had carried with him and then shot himself in the head after being confronted by a sheriff deputy working as a school resource officer.

== Facilities ==
The 254,756-square-foot (23,667.6 m^{2}) facility includes 70 classrooms, two gyms, a weight room, a library, kitchen, a 647-seat theater, a pool, tennis courts, a track and fields for baseball, football, and soccer fields.

== Athletics ==
Arapahoe are part of the 8-team Centennial League that also includes Cherry Creek, Grandview, Cherokee Trail, Smoky Hill, Eaglecrest, Mullen, and Overland.

Arapahoe athletics include baseball, basketball, cheerleading, cross country, dance, football, golf, lacrosse, marching band, soccer, softball, swimming, tennis, track, volleyball, winter guard, field hockey, and wrestling. All athletics at Arapahoe are competed at the 5A / world level.

Girls' golf won the Colorado State Championship in 2010.

The Arapahoe soccer program, known as ABK (Arapahoe Ball Kickers), holds 14 state championships; the girls' program has won nine state titles and the boys' program has five state titles. In 1997 and 1998, members of the ABK and friends formed the Jolly Green Men, supporters of the Colorado Rapids soccer club.

== Publications ==
=== Arapahoe Herald ===
The monthly Arapahoe Herald newspaper is produced by journalism students. In 2005, the Arapahoe Herald was named a National Scholastic Press Association Pacemaker Finalist and went on to win a Pacemaker. The National Pacemaker Awards have been called the high school equivalent of the Pulitzer Prize. In 2005, the Arapahoe Herald received the Pacemaker as well as a Silver Crown from Columbia Scholastic Press Association. It is only the sixth high school newspaper in Colorado to win a Pacemaker in the award's 100+ year history.

In 2007 the Arapahoe Herald received the National Scholastic Press Association's All-American rating, and Columbia Scholastic Press Association's gold medalist Award. In 2008 the paper placed first in the American Scholastic Press Association's Newspaper Review and Contest. The Arapahoe Herald is also included in the National Scholastic Press Association's Hall of Fame for ten consecutive All-American ratings. To date, the newspaper has earned 14 All American ratings since 1992. The Arapahoe Herald won its second NSPA Pacemaker Award in November 2009. The Herald also received Gold Medal awards from the Columbia Scholastic Press Association in 2008 and in 2010.

In 2009, the February issue of the newspaper gained statewide attention for a controversy over articles depicting teenage boys using alcohol to engage in sexual actions with girls, and young women objectifying themselves for attention.

=== Calumet ===
Calumet, the Arapahoe yearbook, is produced by journalism students. Calumet received All-American ratings in both 2005 and 2006 and was a Pacemaker Finalist in 2005.

=== Muse ===
Muse is Arapahoe's literary arts magazine. In 2007, the Muse placed eighth in the National Scholastic Press Association's Best-in-Show, during the Denver Convention.

== Notable alumni ==
- Amy Barczuk — selected in 2013 National Women's Soccer League draft by Western New York Flash
- Melissa Benoist — actress in Fox's Glee and CW's Supergirl
- Tom Costello — NBC NEWS correspondent based in Washington, D.C.
- Tommie Hill — football defensive end who played college football at Colorado State
- Ethan Horvath — goalkeeper for English side, Nottingham Forest and the United States men's national soccer team
- Brian R. James — award-winning game designer and patent holding software engineer
- Steven Moore — literary critic and former managing editor of Dalkey Archive Press/Review of Contemporary Fiction
- Bradford Morrow — novelist and founding editor of literary journal Conjunctions
- AnnaSophia Robb — actress in films such as Soul Surfer, Bridge to Terabithia, and Charlie and the Chocolate Factory, and in CW's The Carrie Diaries
- Willow Pill — winner of RuPaul's Drag Race, Season 14
