= Conservation Colorado =

Non-governmental environmental organization

Conservation Colorado is an organization founded in 2013 as a merger between the Colorado Conservation Voters (CCV) and the Colorado Environmental Coalition. The group promotes environmental conservation.
