= Bow Mar, Colorado =

Town in Colorado, US

- Statutory town
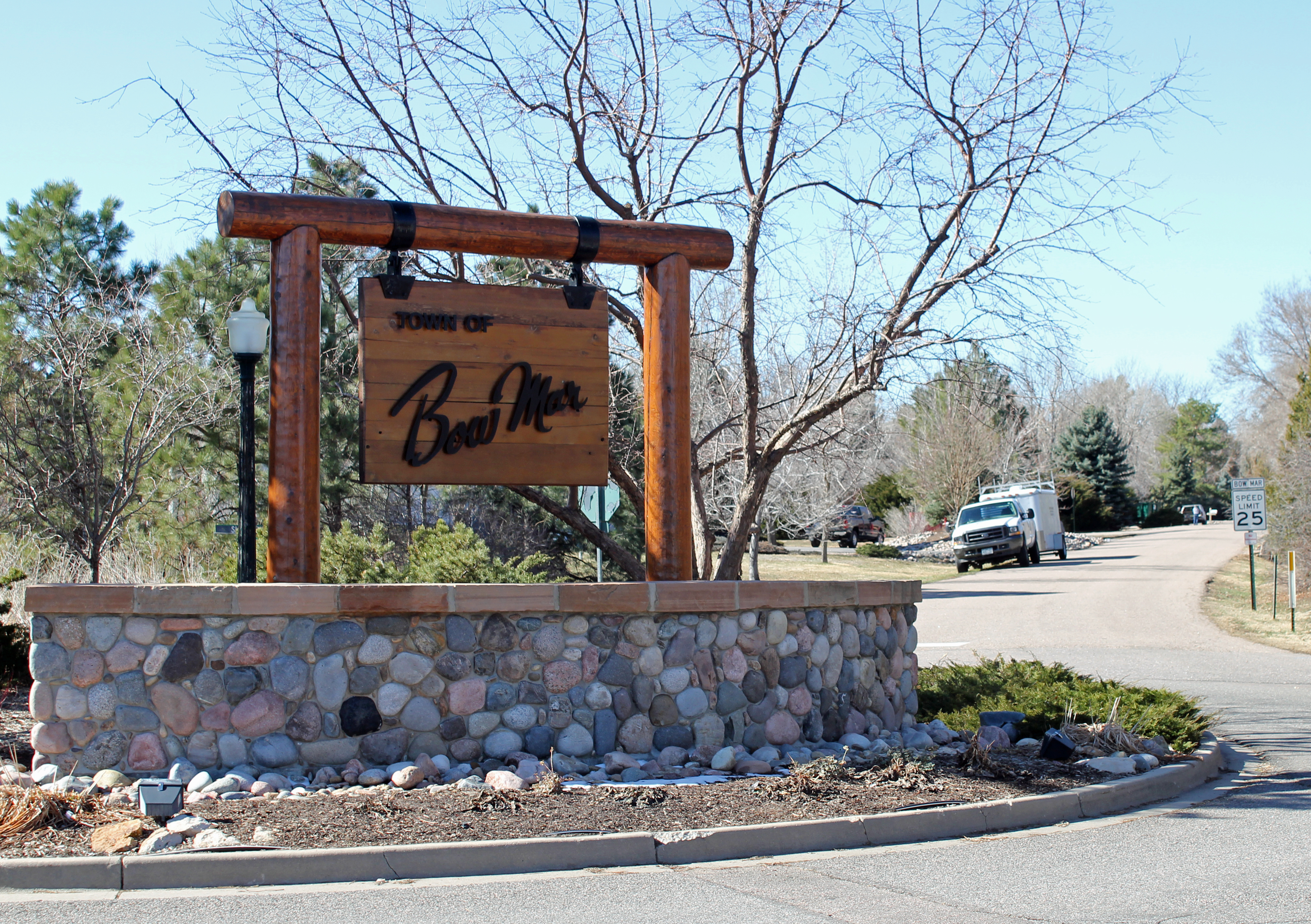
- Bow Mar in 2014

- Location of Bow Mar in Arapahoe and Jefferson counties, Colorado
- Coordinates: 39°37′21″N 105°03′03″W
- Country: United States
- State: Colorado
- County: Arapahoe and Jefferson
- Incorporated (town): August 1958

Government
  - Type: statutory town

Area
  - Total: 0.812 sq mi (2.104 km^{2})
  - Land: 0.662 sq mi (1.714 km^{2})
  - Water: 0.151 sq mi (0.390 km^{2})
- Elevation: 5,538 ft (1,688 m)

Population (2020)
  - Total: 853
  - Density: 1,289/sq mi (498/km^{2})
- Time zone: UTC−07:00 (MST)
  - Summer (DST): UTC−06:00 (MDT)
- ZIP code: 80123
- Area codes: 303/720/983
- GNIS town ID: 2411713
- FIPS code: 08-08070
- Website: townofbowmar.org

Bow Mar is a statutory town located in Arapahoe and Jefferson counties, Colorado, United States. Its population was 853 as of the 2020 United States census with 587 residing in Arapahoe County and 266 residing in Jefferson County.

== History ==
As the Denver-area grew in the late 19th century, the area that is now known as Bow Mar was developed as an agricultural area. It was home to several large farms that provided for both Denver and nearby Littleton. The name Bow Mar is derived from combining the names of two nearby lakes, Bowles Lake and Marston Lake. The lakes were named for two pioneering farmers in the area, Joseph Bowles and John Marston. The Bowles family farmhouse and barn can today be found south of the town of Bow Mar.

As Denver grew in the post-World War II era, Bow Mar farmland was purchased to develop the area into single-family housing. Homes were first constructed in what is now Bow Mar in the late 1940s and early 1950s. In 1947, the first home was built in Bow Mar by land developed by Eleanor and Lloyd King, founder of local supermarket chain King Soopers. The neighborhood was largely built up by the end of the 1950s. Bow Mar was incorporated as a town in 1958 as a town that straddled both Arapahoe and Jefferson counties. When built, many homes in Bow Mar reflected Frank Lloyd Wright's prairie-style architecture. Homes were constructed upon acre lots and were placed on wide streets, and were limited to being no more than one story tall. Today, many houses in the area are being updated or replaced with new construction. Bow Mar has never had its own post office.

In 2026 Bow Mar drew attention for plans to gate of public roads leading into town. Neighbors Denver and Littleton stated they may retaliate with gates of their own leading out of Bow Mar, and have sued to stop the installation.

== Geography ==
At the 2020 United States census, the town had a total area of 520 acres (2.104 km^{2}) including 96 acres (0.390 km^{2}) of water.

== Demographics ==
Historical population
Census	Pop.	Note	%±
1960	748		—
1970	945		26.3%
1980	930		−1.6%
1990	854		−8.2%
2000	847		−0.8%
2010	866		2.2%
2020	853		−1.5%
U.S. Decennial Census

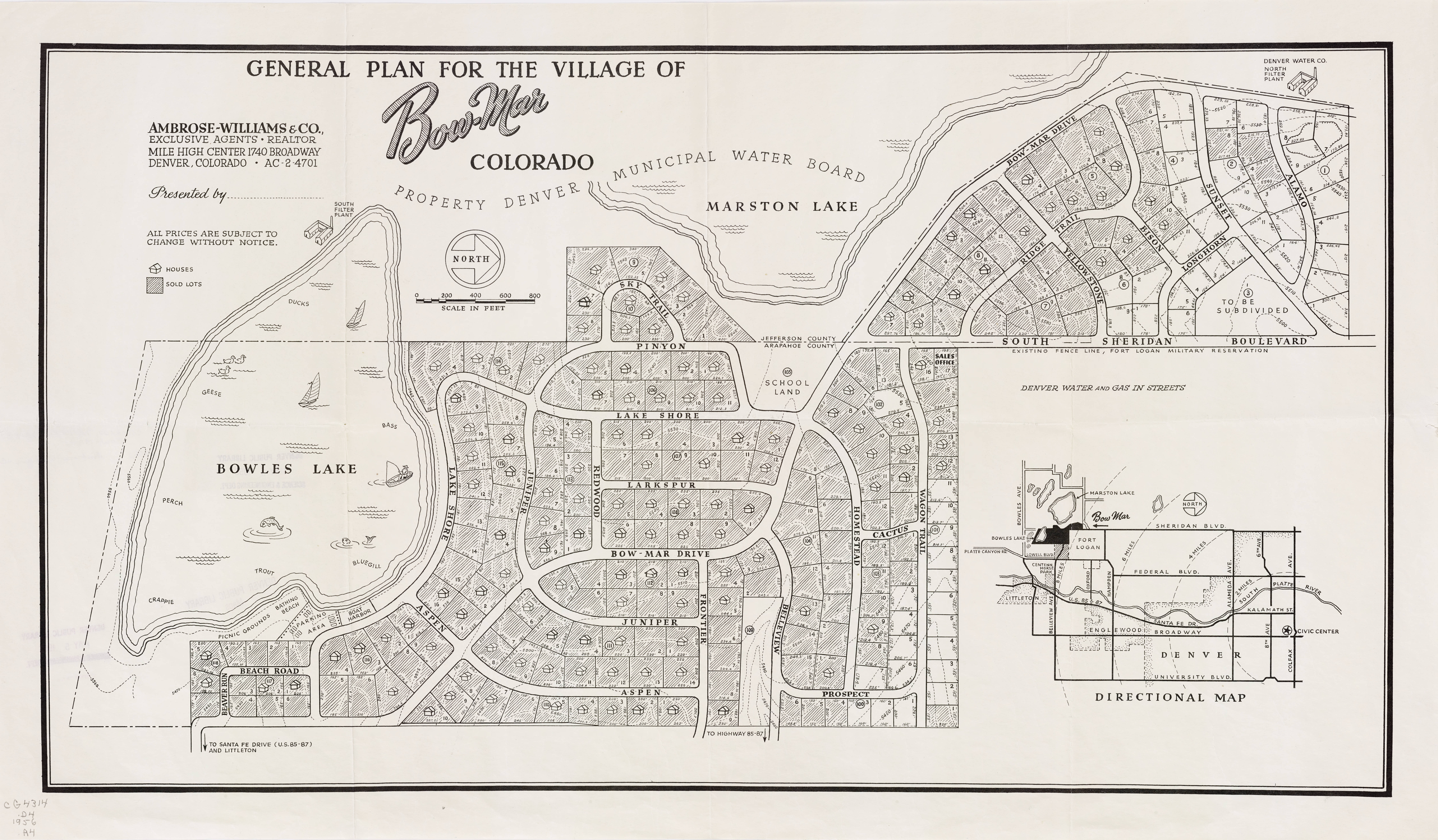
General plan for the village of Bow-Mar 1956

Bow Mar is located within the Denver-Aurora-Lakewood, CO Metropolitan Statistical Area.

As of the census of 2000, there were 847 people, 295 households, and 264 families residing in the town. The population density was 1,181.4 inhabitants per square mile (456.1/km^{2}). There were 302 housing units at an average density of 421.2 per square mile (162.6/km^{2}). The racial makeup of the town was 97.76% White, 0.71% Asian, 0.24% from other races, and 1.30% from two or more races. Hispanic or Latino of any race were 3.78% of the population.

There were 295 households, out of which 40.3% had children under the age of 18 living with them, 82.4% were married couples living together, 5.1% had a female householder with no husband present, and 10.5% were non-families. 8.1% of all households were made up of individuals, and 4.4% had someone living alone who was 65 years of age or older. The average household size was 2.87 and the average family size was 3.04.

In the town, the population was spread out, with 27.3% under the age of 18, 3.3% from 18 to 24, 20.7% from 25 to 44, 32.0% from 45 to 64, and 16.8% who were 65 years of age or older. The median age was 44 years. For every 100 females, there were 99.3 males. For every 100 females age 18 and over, there were 96.8 males.

The median income for a household in the town was $112,300, and the median income for a family was $119,377. Males had a median income of $88,442 versus $61,667 for females. The per capita income for the town was $53,558. About 2.4% of families and 3.4% of the population were below the poverty line, including 1.6% of those under age 18 and 2.2% of those age 65 or over.

== Education ==
The Bow Mar homes situated in Arapahoe County attend part of the Littleton School District. Homes that are within the Jefferson County borders attend Jefferson County Public Schools.

== See also ==
- Front Range Urban Corridor
