= Columbine Valley, Colorado =

Town in Colorado, US

- Statutory town
- Town of Columbine Valley
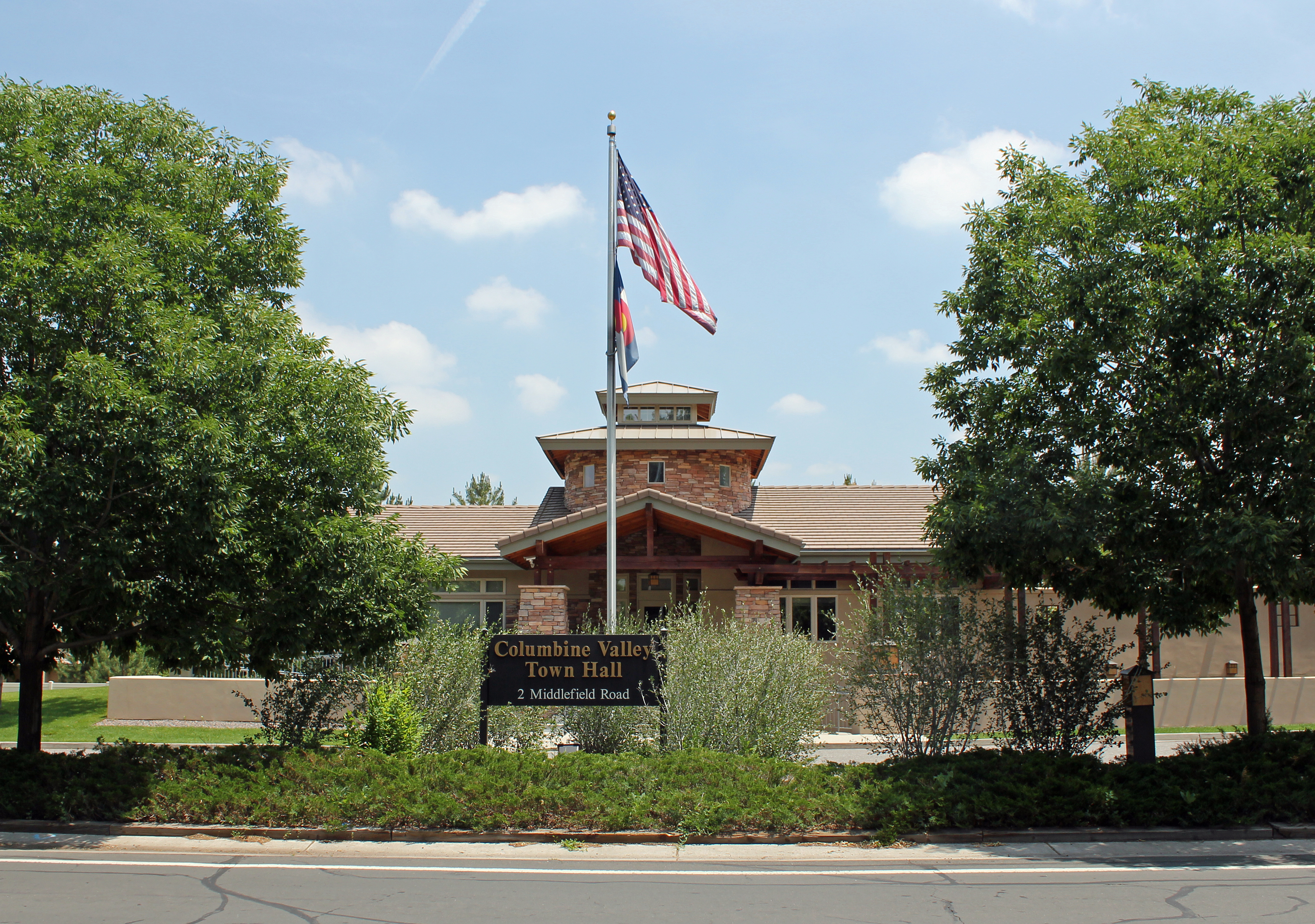
- The Columbine Valley Town Hall.

- Location of the Town of Columbine Valley in Arapahoe County, Colorado
- Coordinates: 39°35′58″N 105°02′07″W
- Country: United States
- State: Colorado
- County: Arapahoe
- Incorporated: July 2, 1959

Government
  - Type: statutory town

Area
  - Total: 0.993 sq mi (2.573 km^{2})
  - Land: 0.982 sq mi (2.543 km^{2})
  - Water: 0.012 sq mi (0.030 km^{2})
- Elevation: 5,358 ft (1,633 m)

Population (2020)
  - Total: 1,502
  - Density: 1,530/sq mi (590/km^{2})
- Time zone: UTC−07:00 (MST)
  - Summer (DST): UTC−06:00 (MDT)
- ZIP code: 80123
- Area codes: 303/720/983
- GNIS town ID: 2413232
- FIPS code: 08-16385
- Website: columbinevalley.org

The Town of Columbine Valley is a statutory town located in far western Arapahoe County, Colorado, United States. The town population was 1,502 at the 2020 United States census, a 19.59% increase since the 2010 United States census. Columbine Valley is a part of the Denver-Aurora-Centennial, CO Metropolitan Statistical Area and the Front Range Urban Corridor.

== History ==
The Columbine Country Club was established in 1955, and the Town of Columbine Valley was incorporated on July 2, 1959, to protect the area.

== Geography ==
At the 2020 United States census, the town had a total area of 636 acres (2.573 km^{2}) including 7.4 acres (0.030 km^{2}) of water.

== Demographics ==
Historical population
Census	Pop.	Note	%±
1970	481		—
1980	923		91.9%
1990	1,071		16.0%
2000	1,132		5.7%
2010	1,256		11.0%
2020	1,502		19.6%
U.S. Decennial Census

=== 2020 census ===
As of the 2020 census, Columbine Valley had a population of 1,502. The median age was 50.5 years. 22.4% of residents were under the age of 18 and 28.9% of residents were 65 years of age or older. For every 100 females there were 99.7 males, and for every 100 females age 18 and over there were 96.5 males age 18 and over.

100.0% of residents lived in urban areas, while 0.0% lived in rural areas.

There were 556 households in Columbine Valley, of which 33.6% had children under the age of 18 living in them. Of all households, 80.4% were married-couple households, 6.3% were households with a male householder and no spouse or partner present, and 12.1% were households with a female householder and no spouse or partner present. About 11.7% of all households were made up of individuals and 7.7% had someone living alone who was 65 years of age or older.

There were 598 housing units, of which 7.0% were vacant. The homeowner vacancy rate was 0.7% and the rental vacancy rate was 26.3%.

Racial composition as of the 2020 census
Race	Number	Percent
White	1,383	92.1%
Black or African American	7	0.5%
American Indian and Alaska Native	0	0.0%
Asian	18	1.2%
Native Hawaiian and Other Pacific Islander	0	0.0%
Some other race	10	0.7%
Two or more races	84	5.6%
Hispanic or Latino (of any race)	63	4.2%

=== 2010 census ===
As of the census of 2010, there were 1,256 people, 491 households, and 421 families residing in the town. There were 530 housing units. The racial makeup of the town was 95.3% White, 0.7% African American, 0.4% Native American, 1.5% Asian, 0% Pacific Islander, and 1.5% from two or more races. Hispanic or Latino of any race were 2.1% of the population.

There were 491 households, out of which 26.5% had children under the age of 18 living with them, 80.9% were married couples living together, 3.1% had a female householder with no husband present, and 14.3% were non-families. 13.4% of all households were made up of individuals, and 37.7% had an individual 65 years of age or older. The average household size was 2.56 and the average family size was 2.79.

In the town, the population was spread out, with 21.1% under the age of 18, 3.4% from 20 to 29, 5.3% from 30 to 39, 11.1% from 40 to 49, 34.6% from 50 to 64, and 22.3% who were 65 years of age or older. The median age was 52.5 years. 49.7% of the population was male and 50.3% was female.

=== Income and poverty ===
The median income for a household in the town was $130,417, and the median income for a family was $149,375. The per capita income for the town was $71,089. None of the families and 0.5% of the population were living below the poverty line, including no under eighteen and 0.6% of those 65 and older.

== Education ==
The school district is Littleton School District 6.

The zoned schools are: Wilder Elementary School, Goddard Middle School, and Heritage High School.

== See also ==
- Front Range Urban Corridor
