= Erik S. Kristensen =

United States Navy officer (1972–2005)

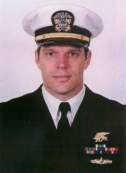
- Kristensen in his uniform
- Born: Erik Samsel Kristensen; March 15, 1972; San Diego, California, U.S.
- Died: June 28, 2005 (aged 33); Kunar Province, Afghanistan
- Burial place: United States Naval Academy Cemetery; Annapolis, Maryland, U.S.
- Military career
- Allegiance: United States of America
- Branch: United States Navy
- Service years: 1995–2005
- Rank: Lieutenant commander
- Unit: U.S. Navy SEALs: SEAL team 10
- Conflicts: War in Afghanistan: Operation Red Wings †
- Awards: Bronze Star with Valor device Purple Heart

Erik Samsel Kristensen (March 15, 1972 – June 28, 2005) was a lieutenant commander of the United States Navy SEALs who was killed in action during Operation Red Wings. He and several other SEALs set off as part of a search and rescue mission, hoping to assist a four-man SEAL team that was engaged in a firefight with Taliban fighters.

== Early life and education ==
Kristensen was born into a military family of partial Danish and Norwegian ancestry. His father, Edward Kristensen, is a career officer in the United States Navy who rose to the rank of Rear Admiral. As his father was in the military, Erik traveled widely with his family as a child, living in such places as Japan, Guam, California, Maryland, Virginia, and Washington, D.C., among others.

He graduated from Gonzaga College High School in Washington, D.C. in 1990, and continued his education at Phillips Academy (Andover, Massachusetts) before moving on to the United States Naval Academy, where he majored in English, and was a member of the Heavyweight Crew Team. After graduation in 1995, he was commissioned an ensign and served in the engineering and combat systems departments of USS Chandler in Everett, Washington. He attended the Graduate Institute at St. John's College in Annapolis, Maryland, while he taught English at the U.S. Naval Academy. He left both his graduate studies and teaching at the academy to pursue a career as a Navy SEAL.

== Career ==
Kristensen reported to Basic Underwater Demolition/Sea, Air, Land training (BUD/S) at Coronado, California at age 27, making him one of the oldest in his class. Kristensen graduated with BUD/S class 233 in March 2001. He then completed Parachute Training and SEAL Qualification Training. His first assignment was to SEAL Team EIGHT as a platoon commander.

=== Operation Red Wings ===
On June 28, 2005, a four-man Navy SEAL reconnaissance and surveillance team was assigned to keep eyes on Ahmad Shah (nom de guerre Mohammad Ismail), who had no affiliation with the Taliban other than fighting against Anti-Coalition Forces, but who was responsible for operations in eastern Afghanistan and the Hindu Kush mountains.

The SEAL team was made up of Matthew Axelson, Danny Dietz, Marcus Luttrell, and Michael P. Murphy. Luttrell was rear medical, Axelson the team's sniper, Dietz the communications officer, and Murphy the team leader. The four SEALs engaged local Taliban forces, they were engaged in an intense gun battle against a force of approximately 30–40 enemy fighters. Murphy risked his life to get off an emergency message to his command. Of the four-man team, only Luttrell would survive.

== Death ==
Upon hearing the distress call, an MH-47 Chinook helicopter was dispatched with a force consisting of SEALs including Kristensen and 160th SOAR Nightstalkers to rescue the team, but the helicopter was shot down by an SA-7 surface to air missile. All 16 men on board the Chinook, including Kristensen, were killed. The battle was later called "the worst single day loss of life for Naval Special Warfare personnel since World War II." In interviews, Ahmad Shah maintained that his forces had set a trap for the American forces: "We certainly know that when the American army comes under pressure and they get hit, they will try to help their friends. It is the law of the battlefield."

== Posthumous ==
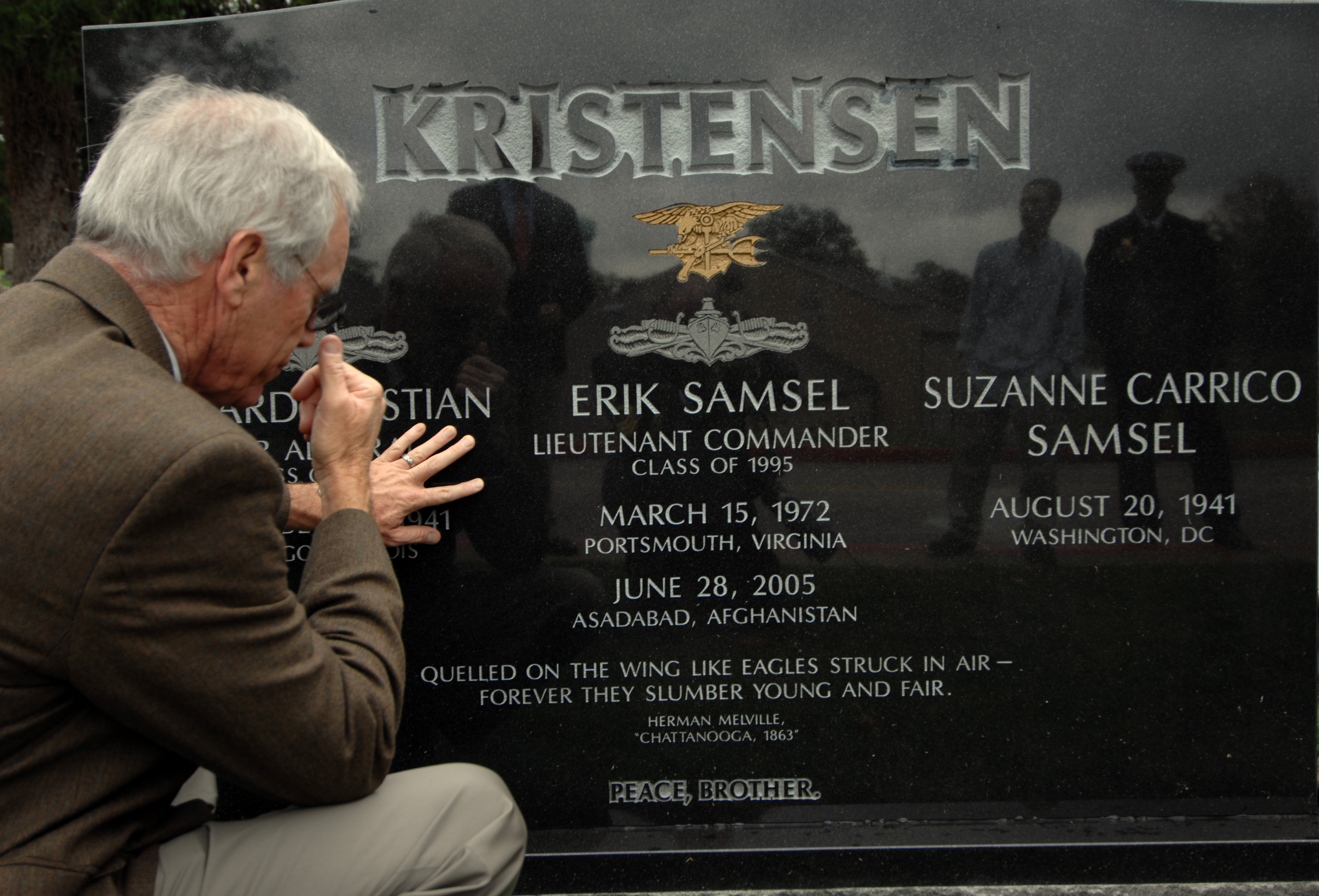
Medal of Honor recipient Michael Murphy's father, viewing Erik's grave in 2007

Days after Kristensen's death was announced, California Governor Arnold Schwarzenegger released a statement stating his deepest condolences to his family and friends and announcing that flags at the California State Capitol would be flown at half-staff in his honor.

Kristensen's funeral Mass (Mass of Christian Burial) was celebrated on July 19, 2005. His mother told the press her son would be buried in his Birkenstock sandals. He is interred at the U.S. Naval Academy Cemetery.

A charity, the LCDR Erik S. Kristensen '90, USN, Memorial Scholarship Fund, was created in Kristensen's honor after his death. It assists a Gonzaga College High School student whose family serves in the U.S. armed forces. The Erik Kristensen Eye Street Klassic is held annually to raise money for the scholarship fund.

== Awards and decorations ==
U.S. military decorations
Bronze Star with Combat "V"
Purple Heart
Navy and Marine Corps Commendation Medal with two gold award star
Navy and Marine Corps Achievement Medal with gold award star
Combat Action Ribbon with gold award star
Battle Efficiency Ribbon
National Defense Service Medal with bronze service star
Afghanistan Campaign Medal
Global War on Terrorism Expeditionary Medal
Global War on Terrorism Service Medal
Navy Sea Service Deployment Ribbon
Navy Expert Rifleman Medal
Navy Expert Pistol Shot Medal

U.S. badges, patches and tabs
Naval Special Warfare insignia
Surface Warfare insignia
Navy and Marine Corps Parachutist Insignia

== In media ==
In the 2013 film Lone Survivor, Kristensen is portrayed by actor Eric Bana.
