= Lone Survivor (book) =

2007 book by Marcus Luttrell

- Hardcover edition
- Author: Marcus Luttrell (Author); Patrick Robinson (Contributor)
- Original title: Lone Survivor: The Eyewitness Account of Operation Redwing and the Lost Heroes of SEAL Team 10
- Language: English
- Subject: Military history
- Genre: Non-fiction
- Publisher: Little, Brown and Company
- Publication date: June 12, 2007
- Publication place: United States
- Media type: Hardcover, paperback, mass market paperback, ebook
- Pages: 390
- ISBN: 978-0-316-06759-1
- OCLC: 151067825
- LC Class: 2007921207

Lone Survivor: The Eyewitness Account of Operation Redwing and the Lost Heroes of SEAL Team 10 (2007) is a non-fiction book written by Marcus Luttrell with assistance from novelist and ghostwriter Patrick Robinson and published by Little, Brown and Company. The narrative takes place in Afghanistan, following Luttrell and a group of U.S. Navy SEALs. It has since seen a 2013 film adaptation of the same name, with Mark Wahlberg starring as Luttrell.

== Synopsis ==
At the beginning of the book, Marcus Luttrell describes his childhood and his training to prepare for the Navy SEALs with Billy Shelton. After joining the U.S. Navy and completing SEAL training, Luttrell describes his posting in Afghanistan, in the Hindu Kush mountains of the Kunar province. With him are the rest of SDVT-1 (SEAL Delivery Vehicle Team 1), except Shane E. Patton, for whom Danny Dietz was substituted. Their mission, Operation Red Wings, was to capture or kill a leading Taliban member thought to be allied with Osama bin Laden.

At an early stage of their mission, the team encountered three goatherds, including a boy. They debated whether they should kill the goatherds to avoid being exposed to the enemy, but after a vote, team leader Michael Murphy decided to uphold the rules of engagement and let the goatherds go. About an hour later, the four SEALs were surrounded by a number of Taliban warriors. The New York Times sums up the story:

Mr. Luttrell was the only one of four men on the mission to survive after a violent clash with dozens of Taliban fighters.

Eight members of the SEALs and eight Army special operations soldiers who came by helicopter to rescue the original four were shot down, and all died.

Luttrell was then rescued by a group of Afghan Pashtun villagers who harbored him in their homes for several days, protecting him from the Taliban and ultimately helping him to safety."

— The New York Times, August 9, 2007

Hospitality as understood by the Pashtun culture is a central theme.

== Reception ==
Reviews of the book have been mostly positive. Conservative commentators Glenn Beck and Michelle Malkin have spoken their support. The book was also showcased on NBC's The Today Show and CNN. The Washington Post wrote: "If you're looking for a true story that showcases both American heroism and Afghani [sic] humanity, Marcus Luttrell's Lone Survivor ... may be the book for you." The book became a New York Times Bestseller. The New York Times review was laudatory, but also noted, "Along with the tragic story about how Mr. Luttrell lost his comrades, the book is spiked with unabashed braggadocio and patriotism, as well as several polemical passages lashing out at the 'liberal media' for its role in sustaining military rules of engagement that prevent soldiers from killing unarmed civilians who may also be scouts or informers for terrorists."

== Accuracy ==
There has been some debate about the exact number of Taliban forces involved in the engagement. In Luttrell's own official after-action report filed with his superiors after his rescue, he estimated the size of the Taliban force to be around 20–35. Initial intel estimates were approximately 10–20. Official media reports from the military estimated the size of the Taliban force to be around 20, while in the Medal of Honor (MOH) citation for LT Michael P. Murphy, the Navy cited 30–40 enemies. In the Summary of Action related to the same MOH, the Navy cites an "enemy force of more than 50 anti-coalition militia". In his book, Victory Point: Operations Red Wings and Whalers – the Marine Corps' Battle for Freedom in Afghanistan, military journalist Ed Darack cites a military intelligence report stating the strength of the Taliban force to be 8–10, compared to the more than 200 claimed by Patrick Robinson in Lone Survivor. The military intelligence estimate cited by Darack is based on research sourced from intelligence reports, including aerial and eye-witness studies of the battlefield after the fact, some from the men sent in to rescue Luttrell, and HUMINT from Afghan intelligence.

== Film adaptation ==
Major studios including Warner Bros., Sony Pictures, Paramount, DreamWorks, and Universal Pictures all put in bids for the film rights, with Universal eventually securing the rights in August 2007 for more than $2 million.

In a June 2012 interview about his new book, Service: A Navy SEAL at War, Luttrell was asked, "is a movie going to be made about Lone Survivor"? He replied, "We will start shooting this September [2012]. It will star Mark Wahlberg who I spoke to a couple of times by phone. I want to make sure that the movie is true to the book. Most people get their information from movies and TV and don't read, so I want to make sure this movie is as realistic as possible."

The film, Lone Survivor, stars Mark Wahlberg, Taylor Kitsch, Ben Foster, Emile Hirsch, Eric Bana, and Alexander Ludwig and was released on January 10, 2014. It was directed by Peter Berg.
