= List of people from Littleton, Colorado =

Coordinates: 39.6133°N 105.0166°W

Location of Littleton in Colorado

This is a list of some notable people who have lived in the City of Littleton, Colorado, United States.

== Arts and entertainment ==
=== Film, television, and theatre ===
- Melissa Benoist (1988–), actress
- Molly Burnett (1988–), actress
- Hayden Byerly (2000–), actor
- Ryan Driller (1982–), pornographic actor
- Allan Kayser (1963–), actor
- Cody Longo (1988–), actor
- Diane Neal (1975–), actress
- Steven Christopher Parker (1989–), actor
- Heather Robinson (1978–), screenwriter
- Brian Ronalds (1973–), actor, director, producer
- Stephen Schiff (1950–), screenwriter, journalist
- Matt Stone (1971–), actor, animator, screenwriter
- Lauren Taylor (1998–), actress

=== Journalism ===
- Renee Chenault-Fattah (1957–), news anchor
- Laura Jane Fraser (1961–), editor, reporter, travel writer
- Bill Kuster (1930–2006), weatherman
- Sue Manteris (1962–), news anchor
- Janice Min (1969–), editor, reporter

=== Literature ===
- Steven Moore (1951–), literary critic, non-fiction writer
- Nancy Stohlman (1973–), writer
- Sheri S. Tepper (1929–2016), writer

=== Music ===
- Kris Bergstrom (1976–), taiko player
- Sera Cahoone (1975–), guitarist, singer-songwriter
- Dave Grusin (1934–), composer, pianist
- Don Grusin (1941–), Grammy Award-winning jazz keyboardist, composer, and producer
- Susan Jeske (1958–), beauty queen, singer
- Riker Lynch (1991–), singer-songwriter, dancer, actor
- Ross Lynch (1995–), singer-songwriter, actor
- Rydel Lynch (1993–), singer, actress, dancer
- David Miller (1973–), singer
- Micah Ortega (1976–), guitarist

=== Other visual arts ===
- Sandy Puc' (1969–), photographer

== Business ==
- Eric C. Anderson (1974–), aerospace engineer, entrepreneur
- Joshua Davis (1971–), technologist, web designer
- Dan Phillips (1945–), house builder, designer

== Military ==
- Danny Dietz (1980–2005), U.S. Navy SEALS gunner's mate, killed in action in 2005 and received the Navy Cross in 2006
- Jack Swigert (1931–1982), U.S. Air Force captain, astronaut

== Politics ==
=== National ===
- Gregory A. Phillips (1960–), U.S. federal judge

=== State ===
- Kathleen Conti, Colorado state legislator
- Linda Newell (1957–), Colorado state legislator
- Joe Rice (1967–), Colorado state legislator
- Christine Scanlan (1964–), Colorado state legislator
- Steve Ward (1960–), Colorado state legislator

== Religion ==
- David Monas Maloney (1912–1995), Roman Catholic prelate

== Sports ==
=== American football ===
- Katie Hnida (1981–), placekicker
- Brandon Kaufman (1990–), wide receiver
- Steve Korte (1960–), center
- Karl Mecklenburg (1960–), linebacker
- Ryan Miller (1989–), offensive guard
- Marc Munford (1965–), linebacker
- Zac Robinson (1986–), quarterback
- Tom Rouen (1968–), punter

=== Baseball ===
- John Burke (1970–), pitcher
- Tim Burke (1959–), pitcher
- Dave Dravecky (1956–), pitcher
- Mark Holzemer (1969–), pitcher
- Mark Huismann (1958–), pitcher
- Bryan King (1996–), pitcher
- Taylor Rogers (1990–), pitcher
- Tyler Rogers (1990–), pitcher
- Steven Wilson (1994–), pitcher

=== Basketball ===
- Jimmy Bartolotta (1986–), guard
- Jared Dillinger (1984–), guard, small forward
- Brooks Thompson (1970–2016), point guard, coach

=== Racing ===
- Jake Eidson (1995–), race car driver

=== Ice hockey ===
- Nicole Hensley (1994–), goaltender for PWHL Minnesota

=== Soccer ===
- Cole Bassett (2001–), midfielder
- Cori Dyke (2000– ), defender, midfielder
- Danielle Foxhoven (1989–), forward, midfielder
- Kristen Hamilton (1992–), forward
- Wes Hart (1977–), defender, coach
- Stephen Keel (1983–), defender
- Craig Thompson (1986–), midfielder
- Jake Traeger (1980–), defender
- Seth Trembly (1982–), defender, midfielder

=== Other sports ===
- Heather Armbrust (1977–), bodybuilder
- Drayson Bowman (1989–), ice hockey center
- Michael Eyssimont (1996–), ice hockey player
- Sarah Hirshland (born 1975), chief executive officer of the United States Olympic Committee
- Bill Loeffler (1956–), golfer
- Jonathan Lujan (1971–), alpine skier
- Scott Munn (1970–), rower

== See also ==
- List of people from Colorado
- Bibliography of Colorado
- Geography of Colorado
- History of Colorado
- Index of Colorado-related articles
- List of Colorado-related lists
- Outline of Colorado
