= Operation Red Wings =

2005 U.S. military operation during the War in Afghanistan

- Part of War in Afghanistan
Date	June 27 – mid-July 2005
Location	Sawtalo Sar Mountain, Korangal Valley, Pech District, Kunar Province, Afghanistan
Result	Taliban victory: Insurgent forces temporarily withdraw before returning three weeks later; Subsequent commencement of Operation Whalers

Belligerents
United States	Taliban al-Qaeda

Commanders and leaders
LtCol Andrew MacMannis, USMC; LCDR Erik S. Kristensen, USN †; LT Michael P. Murphy, USN †	Ahmad Shah

Strength
12 Navy SEALs; 8 Night Stalkers (additional helicopter crews); 2 MH-47 Chinooks; 2 UH-60 Black Hawks; 2 AH-64 Apaches	U.S. and Afghan Intelligence reports: 8–10 insurgents; U.S. Navy: 50+ insurgents; Luttrell's claim: 80–200 insurgents

Casualties and losses
19 killed; • 11 Navy SEALs; • 8 Night Stalkers; 1 wounded; 1 Chinook helicopter shot down	Unknown; U.S Navy claim: 35 killed

Operation Red Wings (often incorrectly referred to as Operation Redwing or Operation Red Wing), informally referred to as the Battle of Abbas Ghar, was a joint military operation conducted by the United States in the Pech District of Kunar Province, Afghanistan. It was carried out from late-June to mid-July 2005 on the slopes of Sawtalo Sar, a mountain approximately 20 miles (32 km) west of the provincial capital of Asadabad. The operation was intended to disrupt the activities of local Taliban-aligned anti-coalition militias (ACM), thus contributing to regional stability and thereby facilitating the September 2005 parliamentary election for the National Assembly of Afghanistan. At the time, Taliban ACM activity in the region was carried out predominantly by a small group led by a local man from Nangarhar Province known as Ahmad Shah, who had aspirations of achieving regional prominence among Muslim fundamentalists. Consequently, Shah and his group were one of the primary targets of the American military operation.

Operation Red Wings was conceived by the 2nd Battalion, 3rd Marines (2/3) of the U.S. Marine Corps based on an operational model developed by 2/3's sister battalion, the 3rd Battalion, 3rd Marines (3/3), which had preceded the 2/3 in their combat deployment. It utilized special operations forces (SOF) units and assets, including members of the U.S. Navy SEALs and the U.S. Army Special Operations Command (USASOC) 160th Airborne Special Operations Aviation Regiment (160th SOAR), for the opening phase of the operation. A team of four Navy SEALs, tasked with surveillance and reconnaissance of a group of structures known to be used by Shah and his men, were ambushed by Shah and his group just hours after inserting into the area by fast-roping from an MH-47 Chinook helicopter. Three of the four SEALs were killed during the ensuing battle, and one of the two quick reaction force (QRF) helicopters sent in for their aid was shot down by an RPG-7 fired by Shah's insurgents, killing all eight U.S. Navy SEALs and all eight U.S. Army Special Operations aviators on board.

The operation then became known as Red Wings II and lasted approximately three more weeks, during which time the bodies of the fallen SEALs and Army Special Operations aviators were recovered and the only surviving member of the initial SEAL team, Marcus Luttrell, was rescued. While the goal of the operation was partially achieved, Shah regrouped in neighboring Pakistan and returned with more men and armaments, boosted by the notoriety he gained from his ambush and helicopter shoot-down during Red Wings. In August 2005, Shah was seriously wounded and his group was destroyed during Operation Whalers in Kunar Province. In April 2008, Shah was killed by Pakistani troops during a gunfight in Pakistan's Khyber Pakhtunkhwa province.

== Origin of name ==
When the 2/3 took the Operation Stars model and developed the specifics of it, 2/3's operations officer, Major Thomas Wood, instructed an assistant operations officer, 1st Lieutenant Lance Seiffert, to compose a list of hockey team names. 2/3 continued the use of hockey team names for large operations. Seiffert's list included ten teams, and the battalion settled on the fourth name on the list, "Red Wings", since the first three, New York Rangers, Chicago Blackhawks, and New Jersey Devils, each could be misconstrued as a reference to military units that were deployed in Afghanistan at the time.

The name has been widely misstated as "Operation Redwing" and sometimes "Operation Red Wing". (Note: Operation Redwing was a 1956 series of nuclear weapons tests.) This error began with the publication of the book Lone Survivor: The Eyewitness Account of Operation Redwing and the Lost Heroes of SEAL Team 10, which was written by Patrick Robinson based on interviews with Marcus Luttrell.

The 2/3 eventually abandoned this naming convention out of sensitivity to the local population, instead opting for using Dari names for animals, including "Pil" (elephant) and "Sorkh Khar" (red donkey).

== Background and development ==
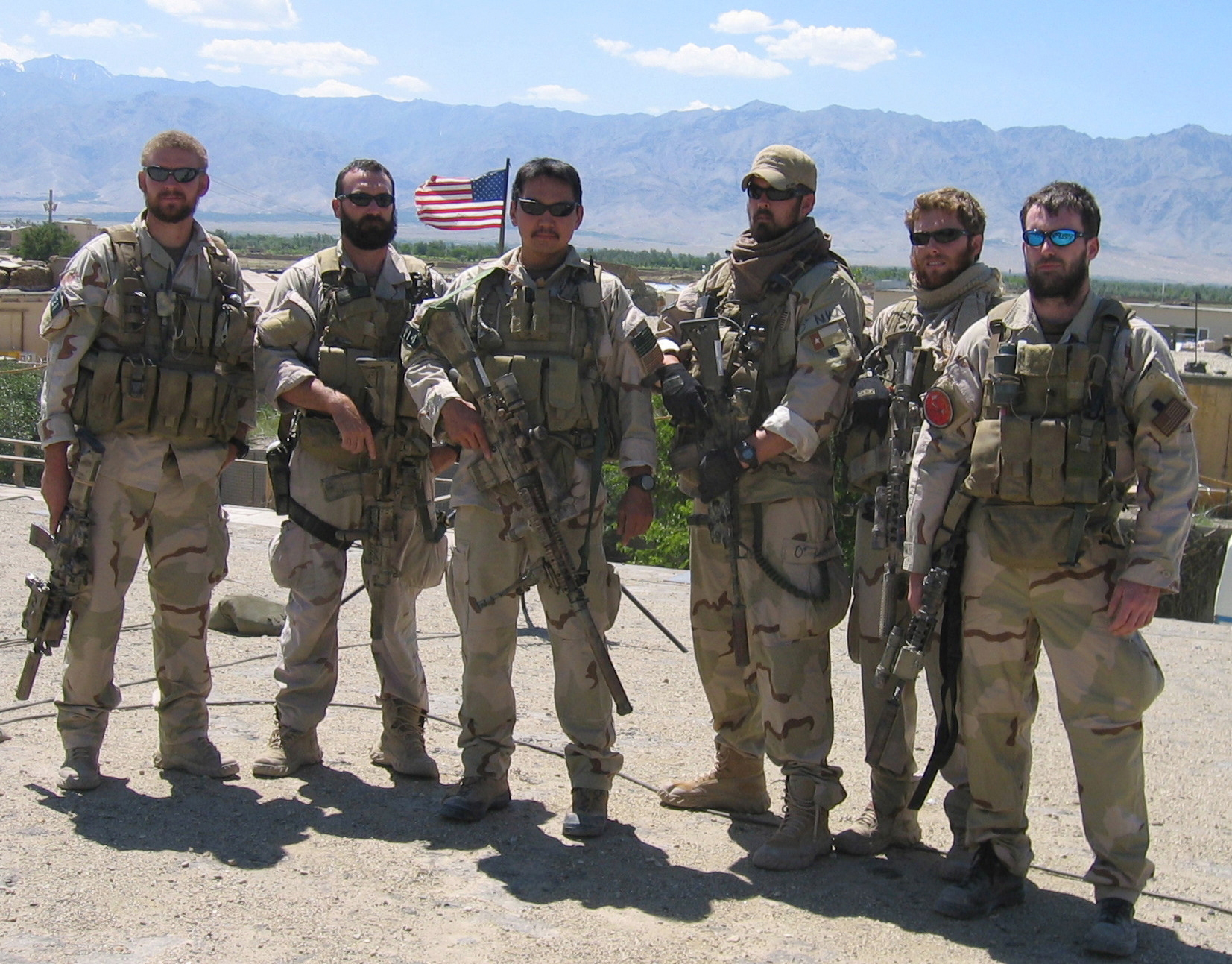
SEALs prior to Operation Red Wings (L to R): Matthew Axelson, Daniel R. Healy, James Suh, Marcus Luttrell, Eric S. Patton, Michael P. Murphy

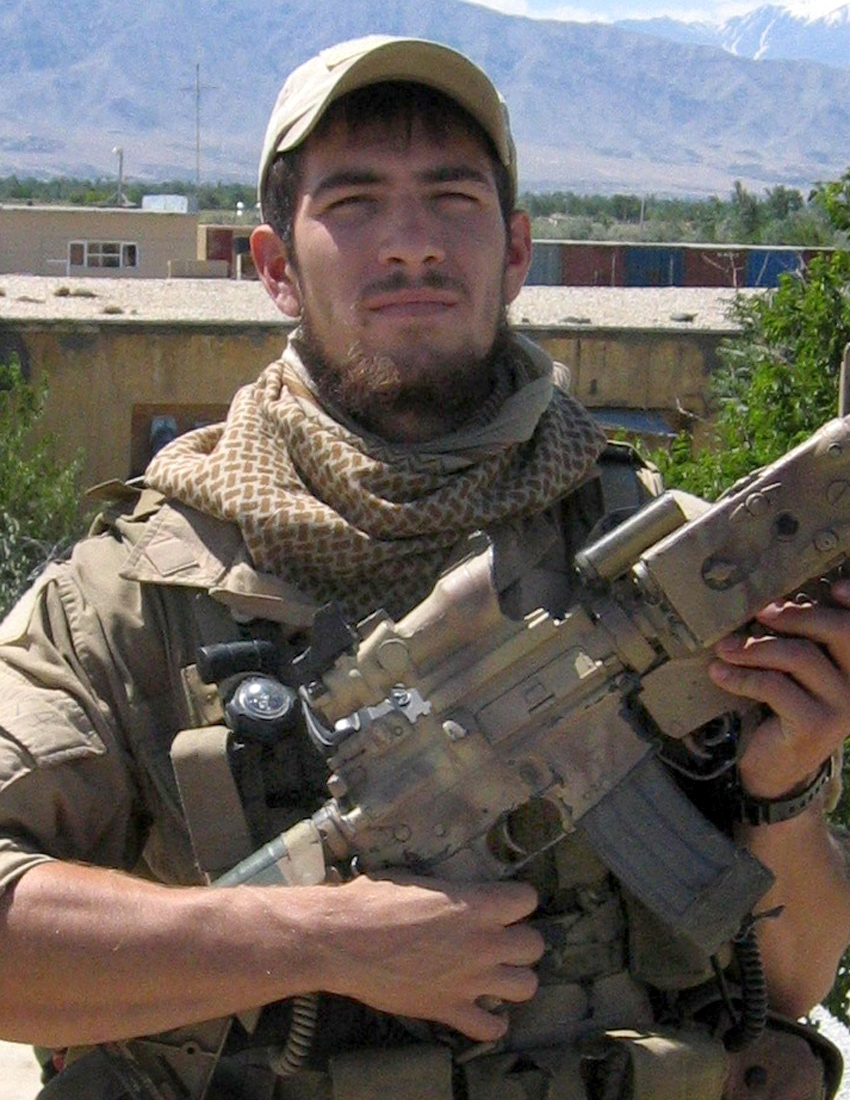
SEAL Danny Dietz

After the initial invasion of Afghanistan in 2001, U.S. military and coalition partner operations shifted from "kinetic" operations to those of a counterinsurgency nature. One of the primary goals of the coalition by 2004 in Afghanistan was nation-building, that is, providing a security environment conducive to the establishment and growth of a democratically elected government, as well as infrastructure support. A key milestone in this campaign was the September 18, 2005, Afghan national parliamentary elections. While many of Afghanistan's provinces at this time had stable security environments, one of the most restive continued to be the Kunar Province, which lies in eastern Afghanistan, on the border with Pakistan. For election results to be seen as legitimate by the citizens of Afghanistan and the world at large, all elections throughout the country would need to proceed "unencumbered" (without external influence, by either American and coalition forces or Taliban and anti-American and coalition forces), including those in Kunar.

Insurgent activity in Kunar Province during this time came from 22 identified groups, some of which had tenuous ties to the Taliban and al-Qaeda while the majority were little more than local criminals. These groups were collectively known as anti-coalition militia (ACM), and the common thread among all was a strong resistance to the unification of the country and subsequent increasing presence of national government entities in the Kunar. This would pose a threat to their activities, some of which included attempting to aid a resurgent neo-Taliban and lumber smuggling. With the goal of successful elections in Kunar, military operations in the area focused primarily on the disruption of ACM activity, and these military operations utilized a number of different units and operational constructs to achieve this goal.

=== Preceding operations and model ===
The 3/3, which deployed to Regional Command East (which included Kunar Province) in late 2004 to conduct stability and counterinsurgency operations in support of Operation Enduring Freedom, identified a number of operational barriers because of Special Operations Command doctrine for the battalion's counterinsurgency work in the area. These barriers included non-sharing of intelligence with the battalion and non-disclosure of impending raids by special operations units in the area. To mitigate these problems, 3/3's staff developed an operational model which integrated special operations forces units into their operations, allowing the sharing of intelligence between the battalion and special operations forces as well as maintaining solid operational control of operations with integrated special operations assets and units by the battalion. Operations that 3/3 conducted based on this model proved successful in disrupting ACM activity. The first of these, Operation Spurs (named after the San Antonio Spurs basketball team), conducted in February 2005, took place in the Korangal Valley, in Kunar Province's Pech District. Spurs utilized Navy SEALs for the opening two phases of the five-phase operation. Similar operations that followed included Operation Mavericks (named after the Dallas Mavericks basketball team) in April 2005, and Operation Celtics (named after the Boston Celtics basketball team) in May 2005. These operations, all of which included Navy SEALs, were conceived and planned by the battalion, with the specifics of those phases involving Navy SEALs being planned by the SEALs. Each operation lasted between three and four weeks. 3/3 planned and executed approximately one of these operations per month, maintaining a consistent operational tempo. The culmination of 3/3's efforts was the April 2005 forced surrender of a regional (and national) high value target, an ACM commander known as Najmudeen, who based his operations out of the Korangal Valley. With the surrender of Najmudeen, ACM activity in the region dropped significantly. Najmudeen's surrender, however, left a power vacuum in the region.

3/3 tracked a number of known ACM groups they determined to be possibly seeking to fill the power void in the region. The battalion began planning a new operation, tentatively called Operation Stars, which was named after the Dallas Stars professional hockey team (3/3's battalion commander, Lieutenant Colonel Norman Cooling, hailed from Texas, hence most operations were named after Texas sports teams) Stars, like the other operations before it, focused on disrupting ACM activity, although Najmudeen's surrender caused activity to drop, and specific groups proved difficult to pinpoint.

In May 2005, the advance party of 3/3's sister battalion, the 2/3, arrived in Regional Command East. Even before deploying to Afghanistan 2/3's, intelligence officer Captain Scott Westerfield and his assistants had been tracking a small cell led by a man named Ahmad Shah, based on intelligence sent back by 3/3's intelligence officer. Shah was from a remote region in Nangarhar Province, which borders the south side of Kunar Province. Shah, they determined, was responsible for approximately 11 incidents against coalition forces and government of Afghanistan entities, including small arms ambushes and improvised explosive device (IED) attacks. By June 2005, 2/3 had relieved-in-place 3/3 and, using the Stars concept, had developed a comprehensive operation which they called Operation Red Wings. Red Wings' goal was disrupting ACM activity, with an emphasis on disrupting Ahmad Shah's activities, which were based near the summit of Sawtalo Sar.

=== Planning stages and intelligence gathering ===
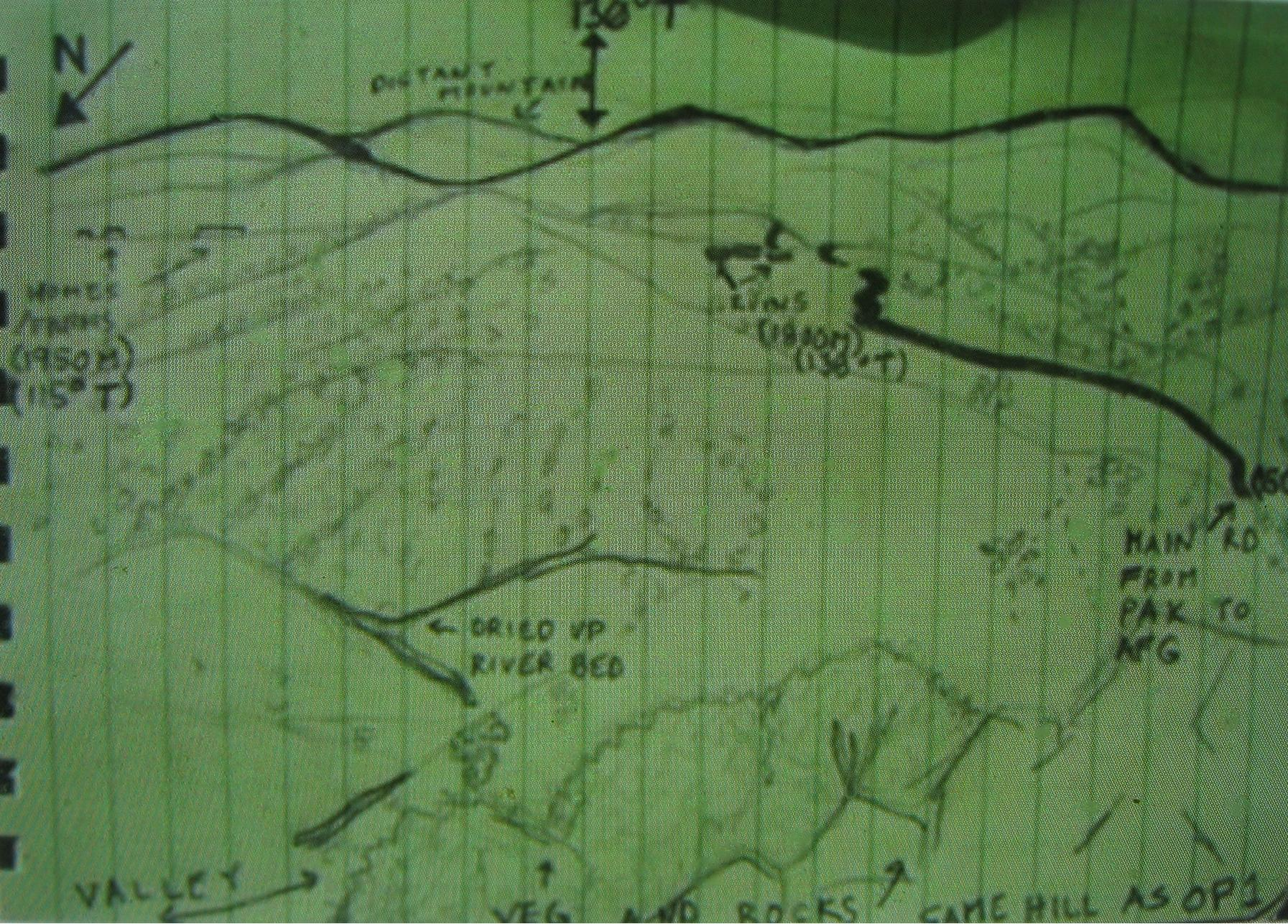
A map of the area and plan relating to Operation Red Wings

2/3's battalion staff began planning Operation Red Wings when they arrived in Afghanistan. Lieutenant Colonel Andrew MacMannis, 2/3's battalion commander, and his staff wanted to maintain the operational tempo set by 3/3. 2/3's operations officer, Major Thomas Wood, began planning the five-phase Red Wings operation off the Operation Stars model. During this time, 2/3's intelligence officer, Captain Scott Westerfield, focused further on learning about Ahmad Shah. His overall intelligence picture of Shah took a substantial leap when 2nd Lieutenant Regan Turner, a platoon commander with 2/3's "Whiskey Company" – a weapons company augmented to function like an infantry line company, gathered a wealth of human intelligence about Shah during a patrol including his full name: Ahmad Shah Dara-I-nur (Ahmad Shah of the Valley of the Enlightened ones); his birthplace, the Kuz Kunar District of Nangarhar Province; his primary alias: Ismael; his chief allegiance: Gulbuddin Hekmatyar, who was based out of the Shamshato Refugee Camp near Peshawar, Pakistan; his group's size: fifty to one hundred fighters; and his goals: to impede the upcoming elections and attempt to aid a resurgent Taliban in the region. Although Shah was a relatively unknown entity in the region, he apparently held regional aspirations and possibly had the assistance of Gulbuddin Hekmatyar. 2nd Lieutenant Turner also gathered a number of photographs of Shah.

Further intelligence, including human intelligence and signals intelligence, indicated that Shah based his operations out of some small structures outside of the village of Chichal, high on the slopes of Sawtalo Sar mountain in the upper Korangal Valley, approximately 20 miles (32 km) to the west of Kunar's provincial capital Asadabad. Using imagery intelligence taken from an unmanned aerial vehicle on June 17, 2005, Westerfield identified likely structures used for housing his team, IED making, and overwatch of the area below for IED strikes. The intelligence staff identified four named areas of interest containing specific structures which Shah might be using. Westerfield and his staff determined that Shah and his men had been responsible for approximately 11 incidents against American, Coalition, and Afghan government entities, including IED strikes and small arms ambushes. They determined that Shah and his men would be occupying the area of Chichal in late June, a time of low lunar illumination. The operation would require a helicopter insertion of forces to cordon the area and search for Shah and his men. They sought to conduct this operation at night, after positive identification of Shah by a Marine Corps scout sniper team, which would walk into the area under cover of darkness some nights before.

As with 3/3 before them, 2/3 sought to use Special Operations Forces assets for Red Wings but, unlike 3/3, they sought only the use of Special Operations Aviation assets, specifically, MH-47 Special Operations Aircraft of the 160th SOAR, not any ground forces. Combined Joint Special Operations Task Force – Afghanistan refused this request, stating that in order for Red Wings to be supported with Special Operations aviation the battalion would have to task the opening phases of the operation to Special Operations ground forces. During the opening phases, the Marines of 2/3 would act in a supporting role. After the initial phases were completed, 2/3 could become the lead element. The battalion agreed to this, believing, however, that this unconventional command structure defied a fundamental tenet of successful military operations – "unity of command". The operation was presented to a number of Special Operations units working in the area for possible "buy in". U.S. Navy SEALs from SEAL Team 10 and SEAL Delivery Vehicle Team 1 expressed interest.

== Execution of the operation ==
Red Wings was planned as a five-phase operation:

- Phase 1 - Shaping: A U.S. Navy SEAL reconnaissance and surveillance team is tasked to insert in the region of the suspected safe buildings of Ahmad Shah, observe and identify Shah and his men and specific locations, and guide a direct action team of phase two to structures in which Shah and his men are observed to be staying.
- Phase 2 - Action on the Objective: A SEAL direct action team is to insert by MH-47, followed shortly by Marines, to capture or kill Shah and his men.
- Phase 3 - Outer Cordon: Marines, along with Afghan National Army soldiers, are to sweep surrounding valleys for other suspected insurgents.
- Phase 4 - Security and Stabilization: In the days after the first three phases, U.S. Marines, Afghan National Army soldiers, and U.S. Navy corpsmen will provide medical care to the local population and determine local needs, such as improved roads, wells, and schools.
- Phase 5 - Exfiltration: Depending on enemy activity, the Marines will remain in the area for up to one month, then depart the area.

While the Marines planned the overall operation, the SEALs planned the specifics of their roles of Red Wings.

=== Insertion of SEAL team, compromise and attack ===
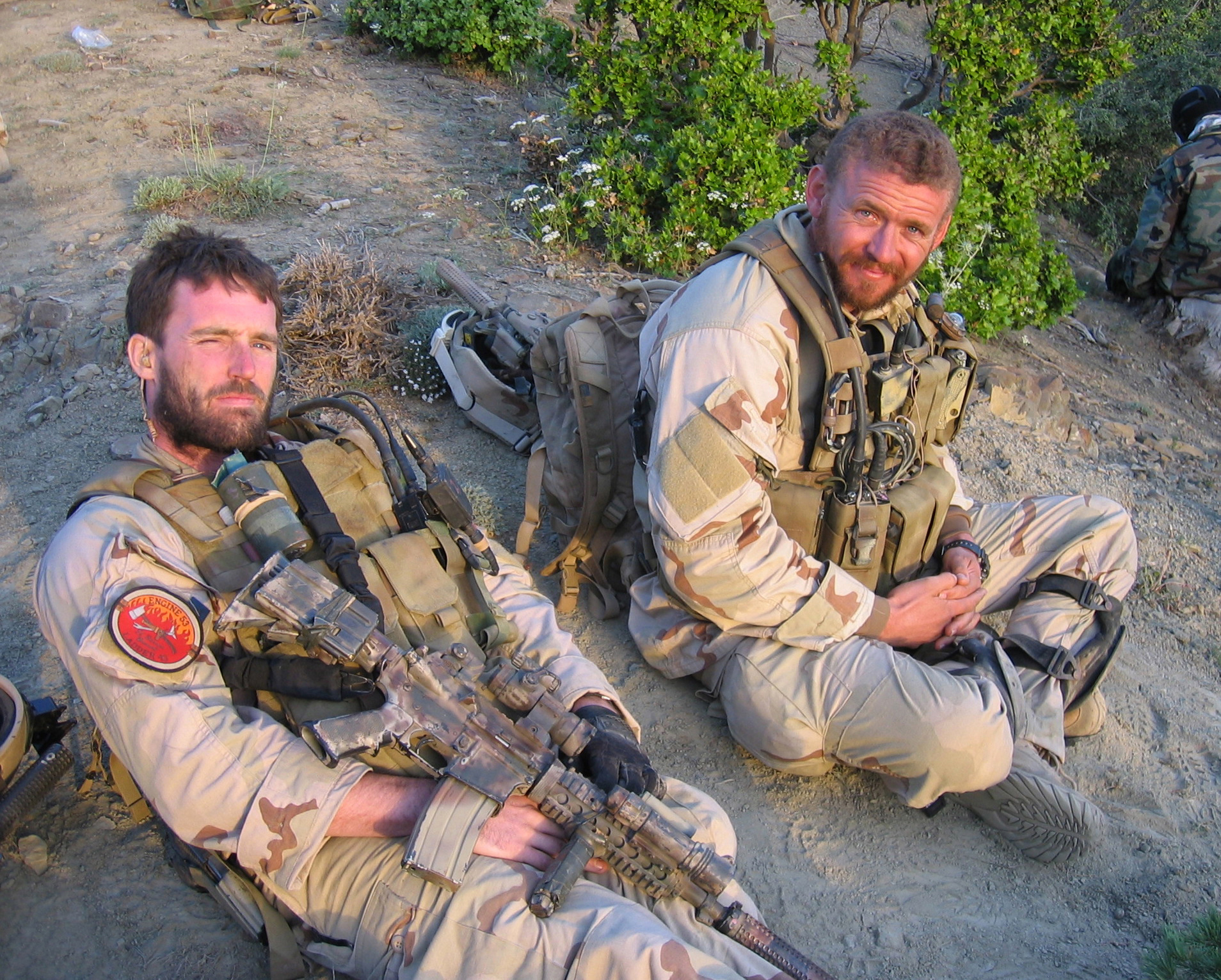
Michael Murphy (left) with Matthew Axelson, in Afghanistan

Late in the night of June 27, 2005, two MH-47 helicopters approached Sawtalo Sar. While one of the aircraft performed a number of "decoy drops" to mislead any enemy observers, the other inserted a four-man Navy SEAL reconnaissance and surveillance team via fast rope in a saddle between Sawtalo Sar and Gatigal Sar, a peak just to the south of Sawtalo Sar. The insert point was roughly one and one half miles from the nearest Named Area of Interest. The team members were team leader Lieutenant Michael P. Murphy of SEAL Delivery Vehicle Team 1, based out of Pearl Harbor, Hawaii; Petty Officer Second Class Danny Dietz from SEAL Delivery Vehicle Team 2, based out of Virginia Beach, Virginia; Petty Officer Second Class Matthew G. Axelson from SEAL Delivery Vehicle Team 1; and Navy Hospital Corpsman Second Class Marcus Luttrell, of SEAL Delivery Vehicle Team 1. After moving to a pre-determined covered overwatch position, from which the SEALs could observe the Named Areas of Interest, the team was discovered by local goat herders. Determining that they were civilians, not combatants, Murphy released them, according to rules of engagement.

The team, surmising that they would likely be compromised, retreated to a fallback position. Within an hour, the SEAL Reconnaissance and Surveillance team was attacked by Shah and his men who were armed with RPK machine guns, AK-47s, RPG-7 rocket-propelled grenades, and an 82mm mortar. The intensity of the incoming fire, combined with the type of attack, forced the SEAL team into the northeast gulch of Sawtalo Sar, on the Shuryek Valley side of Sawtalo Sar. The SEALs made a number of attempts to contact their combat operations center with an AN/PRC-148 multi-band radio and then with a satellite phone. The team could not establish consistent communication other than for a period long enough to indicate that they were under attack. Three of the four team members were killed and the only survivor, Luttrell, was left unconscious with a number of fractures and other serious wounds. He regained consciousness and was rescued by local Pashtun, who ultimately saved his life. In his condition, without assistance, he would probably have been killed or captured by the Taliban.

=== Red Wings II: search, rescue, recovery, and presence operations ===
Since the SEAL reconnaissance and surveillance team had been ambushed, the focus of the operation immediately shifted from disrupting ACM activity to finding, aiding, and extracting the team members. The operation became known as Operation Red Wings II.

After the broken transmission from the SEAL team, their position and situation were unknown. Members of SEAL Team 10, U.S. Marines, and aviators of the 160th SOAR were prepared to dispatch a quick reaction force, but approval for launch from higher special operations headquarters was delayed for several hours. A quick reaction force finally launched, consisting of two MH-47 Special Operations Aircraft of the 160th, two conventional Army UH-60 Black Hawk helicopters, and two AH-64 Apache attack helicopters. The two MH-47s took the lead. Upon reaching Sawtalo Sar, the two MH-47s received small arms fire. During an attempt to insert SEALs riding in one of the MH-47 helicopters, one of Ahmad Shah's men fired an RPG-7 rocket-propelled grenade which struck the transmission below the rear rotor assembly, causing the aircraft to immediately plummet to the ground. All eight 160th SOAR aviators and crew and all eight Navy SEALs on board were killed, including commander of the 160th, Major Stephen C. Reich, and ground commander LCDR Erik S. Kristensen, of SEAL Team 10.

Command and control was lost and neither visual nor radio contact could be established with the SEAL team. At this point, late in the afternoon, storm clouds were moving in over the region and the aircraft returned to their respective bases. A massive search began, at first from the ground, and then with aviation assets which were able to retrieve the bodies of the 16 killed in the MH-47 shootdown. Meanwhile, Luttrell had been taken in by a local Afghan, Gulab, from the village of Salar Ban, roughly 0.7 miles (1.1 km) down the northeast gulch of Sawtalo Sar from the location of the ambush. After word was received of his survival, Luttrell and Gulab were recovered by United States Air Force Pararescuemen (PJs) Josh Appel and Chris Piercecchi of the 59th Expeditionary Rescue Squadron (305th Rescue Squadron deployed). Based on Luttrell's descriptions of the area, Appel and Piercecchi returned to the site of the battle two days later and retrieved the remains of Dietz, Murphy and Axelson.

=== Afghans who aided Luttrell ===
In the years following Operation Red Wings, more details emerged about the circumstances surrounding Luttrell's survival, including that he was given sanctuary by local villagers. Many of the details regarding the Afghans who aided Luttrell were reported incorrectly in the American press during the days after the events occurred.

The SEALs' firefight with Ahmad Shah's Taliban forces began along a high-elevation ridgeline called Sawtalo Sar (whose highest peak is 2,830 m (9,280 ft)). A descent down the east side of the ridgeline leads into the Shuryek Valley. The northeastern gulch in which the SEALs became trapped was in this direction, above the village of Salar Ban. To the west of the Sawtalo Sar ridgeline is the Korangal Valley. As the wounded Luttrell descended the gulch, he encountered a Pashtun named Mohammad Gulab Khan from the mountain village of Salar Ban. Known simply as Gulab, he took Luttrell into his home that first day in accordance with the Pashtunwali custom of Nanawatai, whereby asylum is given to a person to protect them from their enemies. Gulab then invoked the assistance of fellow villagers to help protect Luttrell until American forces could be contacted.

Not long before Operation Red Wings, relations with the Americans had improved in the Shuryek Valley and the greater Pech River region because of humanitarian work that had taken place. Medical services had been provided and a girls' school was built at Nangalam. Gulab was aware of these developments and had introduced himself to the Marine commander at Nangalam, Matt Bartels, when he was visiting Matin. It was partly because of this goodwill that Gulab gave Luttrell sanctuary. The Taliban leader, Ahmad Shah, knew that the wounded man he was tracking had to have passed through the village of Salar Ban as he made his way downhill. Through intimidation, Shah was able to ascertain which house sheltered the wounded man and demanded that he be turned over. However, Gulab had invoked the assistance of fellow villagers in protecting Luttrell until American forces could be contacted. Shah could not risk a fight at that stage as he was outnumbered. It is likely Luttrell would have been turned over to the Taliban had he descended into the Korangal instead of Shuryek. Luttrell was subsequently moved to different places until forces could arrive to extract him.

Luttrell wrote a note and asked that it be taken to the American base at Asadabad. Gulab, refusing to leave Luttrel, asked a distant relative, an older man called Shina, to make the trek with the note to Commander Matt at the Nangalam base and gave him 1,000 Afghan afghanis (US$20 as of 2005) for the trip. This required a longer journey down the trails of the Shuryek valley to Matin, where he then hired a cab to drive the Pech road to Nangalam. When Shina reached the base in Nangalam in the middle of the night, he met with the commander and related the story about a wounded American soldier in their village. He then gave him the note Luttrell had written.

In the weeks following Marcus Luttrell's rescue, Gulab and his family received threats from the Taliban, and they were relocated to Asadabad.

=== American deaths ===
Name	Age	Action	Hometown
Navy SEALs
LT Michael P. Murphy	29	Part of 4-Man SEAL team, killed in an ambush	Patchogue, New York
SO2 Matthew Axelson	29	Part of 4-Man SEAL team, killed in an ambush	Cupertino, California
SO2 Danny Dietz	25	Part of 4-Man SEAL team, killed in an ambush	Littleton, Colorado
SOC Jacques J. Fontan	36	Killed aboard the helicopter when it was shot down	New Orleans, Louisiana
SOCS Daniel R. Healy	36	Killed aboard the helicopter when it was shot down	Exeter, New Hampshire
LCDR Erik S. Kristensen	33	Killed aboard the helicopter when it was shot down	San Diego, California
SO1 Jeffery A. Lucas	33	Killed aboard the helicopter when it was shot down	Corbett, Oregon
LT Michael M. McGreevy Jr.	30	Killed aboard the helicopter when it was shot down	Portville, New York
SO2 James E. Suh	28	Killed aboard the helicopter when it was shot down	Deerfield Beach, Florida
SO1 Jeffrey S. Taylor	30	Killed aboard the helicopter when it was shot down	Midway, West Virginia
SO2 Shane E. Patton	22	Killed aboard the helicopter when it was shot down	Boulder City, Nevada
Army 160th SOAR
SSG Shamus O. Goare	29	Killed aboard the helicopter when it was shot down	Danville, Ohio
CWO3 Corey J. Goodnature	35	Killed aboard the helicopter when it was shot down	Clarks Grove, Minnesota
SGT Kip A. Jacoby	21	Killed aboard the helicopter when it was shot down	Pompano Beach, Florida
SFC Marcus V. Muralles	33	Killed aboard the helicopter when it was shot down	Shelbyville, Indiana
MSG James W. Ponder III	36	Killed aboard the helicopter when it was shot down	Franklin, Tennessee
MAJ Stephen C. Reich	34	Killed aboard the helicopter when it was shot down	Washington Depot, Connecticut
SFC Michael L. Russell	31	Killed aboard the helicopter when it was shot down	Stafford, Virginia
CWO4 Chris J. Scherkenbach	40	Killed aboard the helicopter when it was shot down	Jacksonville, Florida

== Aftermath ==
Ahmad Shah and his group recovered a large amount of weapons, ammunition, and other materials, including three SOPMOD M4 Carbines fitted with M203 40mm grenade launchers, a ruggedized laptop with an intact hard drive containing maps of embassies in Kabul, night-vision devices, and a sniper spotting scope, among other items from the Navy SEAL reconnaissance and surveillance team, items which they could then use against American, Coalition, and Afghan government entities. Shah had two videographers with him during the ambush and As-Sahab Media released their video of the ambush and images of the items recovered from the SEALs.

A large amount of resources were devoted to the search, rescue, and recovery operations of Red Wings II. As a result, Ahmad Shah and his men left the region and regrouped in Pakistan. During the following weeks of Red Wings II, ground units of 2/3 undertook a number of patrols, as did members of the Afghan National Army, Army Special Operations units, and Navy Special Operations units. These "presence operations" achieved the goal of disrupting ACM activity but at great cost, and upon the exfiltration of troops, Ahmad Shah and his reinforced cell were able to return to the area weeks later.

Significant international media attention was focused on the ambush and the MH-47 shootdown. The size of Shah's group increased as additional fighters joined his ranks. With the withdrawal of American and Coalition troops at the end of Red Wings II, Shah and his group were able to return to the Kunar Province and begin attacks again. Some survivors from the rescue mission, Operation Red Wings II, have reported suffering from PTSD.

The "sequel" to the original mission, Operation Red Wings, was Operation Whalers, which 2/3 planned and executed in August 2005. During Operation Whalers, Shah's group in Kunar Province was neutralized, and Shah was seriously wounded. In April 2008, Shah was killed during a shootout with Pakistani police in the Khyber-Pakhtunkhwa.

== Commemoration ==
=== Honors ===
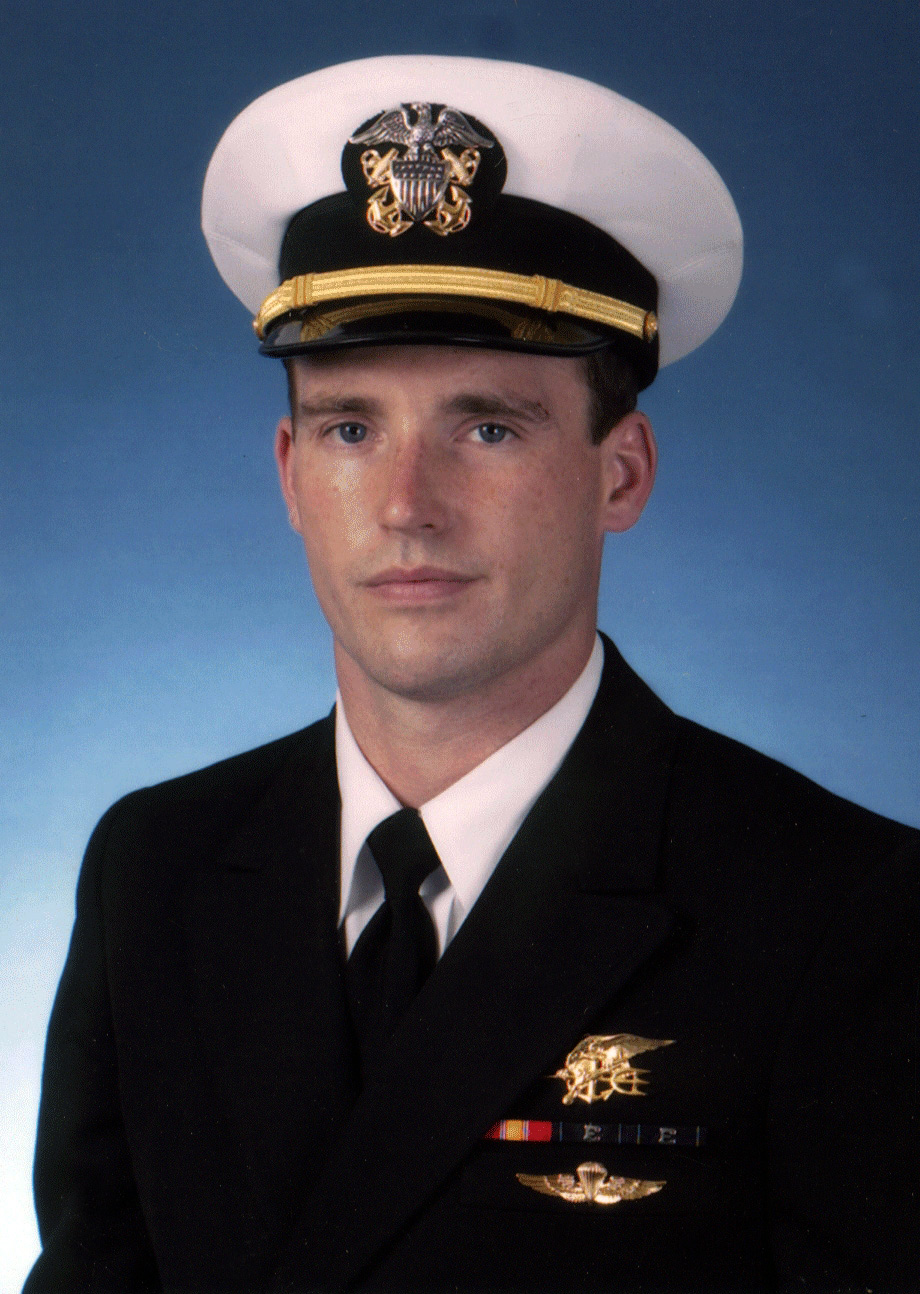
Lieutenant Michael P. Murphy of the U.S. Navy, posthumous Medal of Honor recipient

On September 14, 2006, Dietz and Axelson were posthumously awarded the Navy Cross for "undaunted courage" and heroism. Luttrell was also awarded the Navy Cross, in a ceremony at the White House. In 2007, Murphy was posthumously awarded the Medal of Honor for his actions during the battle.

On June 28, 2008, Luttrell and the family members of soldiers killed overseas were honored at a San Diego Padres game. In addition, the United States Navy Parachute Team, the Leap Frogs, brought in the American flag, the POW/MIA flag and the San Diego Padres flag. The attendees were given a standing ovation by the more than 25,000 there to watch the game.

=== Memorials ===
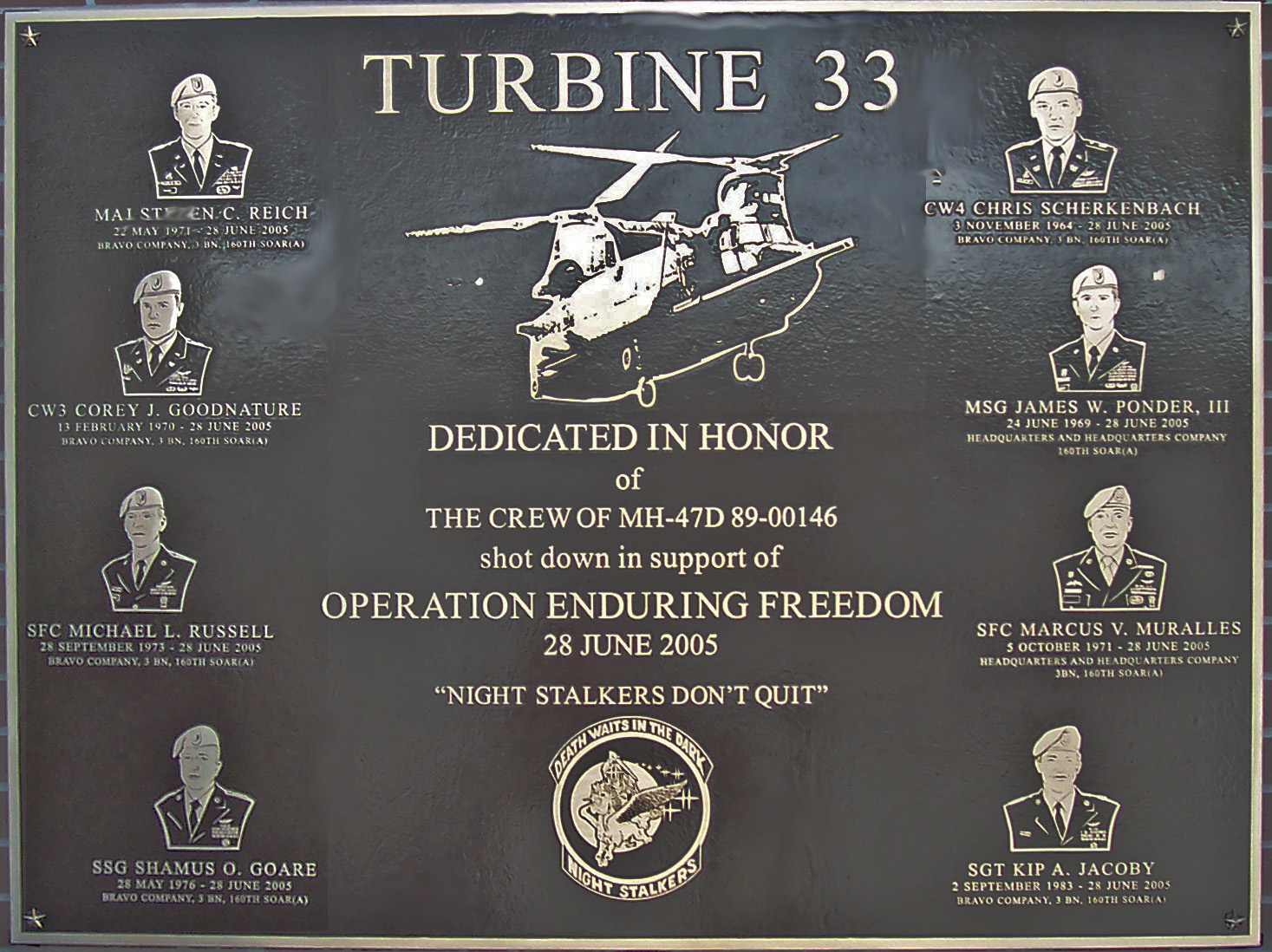
Memorial plaque in memory of the U.S. Army Night Stalkers killed in Operation Red Wings

W. Stanley Proctor sculpted a work for the Veteran's Memorial Park in Cupertino, California, called The Guardians, which commemorates the SEALS killed in the operation. It is one of the first sculptured memorials to those who served in the War in Afghanistan. It was dedicated by Secretary of the Navy Donald Winter in November 2007. The sculpture depicts Matthew Axelson and James Suh in full combat equipment. Proctor offered his opinion to the Tallahassee Democrat that it is "my best work yet". Because of his scrupulous devotion to realistic depictions of humans, Proctor was the personal choice of Axelson's family for the project, and they made that recommendation to the committee.

== Disputed information ==
There has been some conflict over the number of Taliban forces involved in the engagement. In Luttrell's own official after-action report filed with his superiors after his rescue, he estimated the size of the Taliban force to be around 20–35. Luttrell claims in his book that during the briefing his team was told around 80 to 200 fighters were expected to be in the area. Initial intel estimated approximately 10 to 20. Official media reports from the military estimated the size of the Taliban force to be around 20 as well, while in the Medal of Honor citation for Murphy, the Navy cited 30–40 enemies. In the Summary of Action related to the same citation, the Navy cites an "enemy force of more than 50 anti-coalition militia". In his book, Victory Point: Operations Red Wings and Whalers – the Marine Corps' Battle for Freedom in Afghanistan, military journalist Ed Darack cites a military intelligence report stating the strength of the Taliban force to be 8–10. The military intelligence estimate cited by Darack is based on research sourced from intelligence reports, including aerial and eye-witness studies of the battlefield after the fact, including the men sent in to rescue Luttrell, as well as reports from Afghan intelligence.

The claim in Luttrell's book that Murphy considered and put to the vote the possible execution of unarmed civilians who stumbled upon the SEAL team has been criticized and dismissed by many as fiction. In an article by Sean Naylor, Army Times senior correspondent, Navy Special Warfare Command spokesman Lieutenant Steve Ruh stated that with respect to making command decisions in the field, "Whether they're officer or enlisted, the senior guy ultimately has the ultimate authority." And with regards to voting whether or not to execute unarmed civilians, he admitted, "This is the first time I've ever heard of anything put to a vote like that. In my 14 years of Navy experience, I've never seen or heard of anything like that."

In the June 12, 2007 article "Survivor's book dishonors son's memory" by Michael Rothfeld in Newsday, Murphy's father Dan claims that Murphy would never have considered executing unarmed civilians, let alone putting such a grave decision up for a vote (in reference to the purported vote of execution of unarmed locals). Military protocol, United States and international military doctrine, and rules of engagement strictly forbid harming unarmed non-combatant civilians, with one of the specific rules of engagement in effect at the time stating, "Civilians are not targets!"

== In popular culture ==
=== Literature ===
- The autobiography of Marcus Luttrell, titled Lone Survivor: The Eyewitness Account of Operation Red wings and the Lost Heroes of SEAL Team 10 (2007).

=== Film ===
- The American film Lone Survivor (2013), starring Mark Wahlberg, is based on Luttrell's book.

== Bibliography ==
- Darack, Ed (2010). Victory Point: Operations Red Wings and Whalers – The Marine Corps' Battle for Freedom in Afghanistan. Penguin Group. ISBN 978-0-425-23259-0. Archived.
- Luttrell, Marcus; Robinson, Patrick (2007), Lone Survivor: The Eyewitness Account of Operation Redwing and the Lost Heroes of SEAL Team 10, Back Bay Books, ISBN 978-0-316-06759-1, Available at Archive.org
- Williams, Gary (2010). Seal of Honor: Operation Redwing and the Life of LT. Michael P. Murphy, USN. Naval Institute Press. ISBN 978-1-59114-957-6.
