= Danny Dietz =

US Navy SEAL and recipient of the Navy Cross (1980–2005)

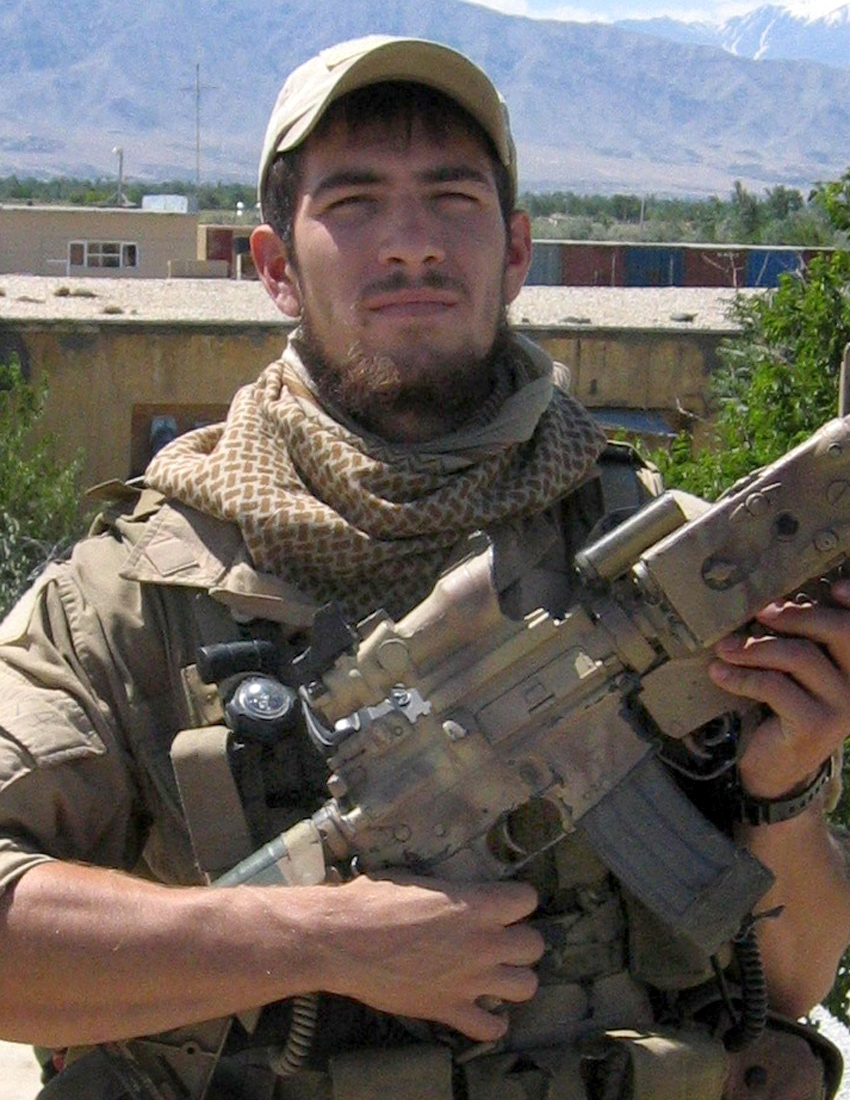
- Dietz in Afghanistan
- Born: Danny Phillip Dietz Jr. January 26, 1980; Aurora, Colorado, U.S.
- Died: June 28, 2005 (aged 25); Kunar Province, Afghanistan
- Burial place: Fort Logan National Cemetery; Denver, Colorado, U.S.
- Spouse: Maria L. Dietz (m. 2003–2005)
- Military career
- Allegiance: United States of America
- Branch: United States Navy
- Service years: 1999–2005
- Rank: Gunner's mate, Second class
- Unit: U.S. Navy SEALs: SDV Team 2
- Conflicts: War in Afghanistan: Operation Red Wings †
- Awards: Navy Cross; Purple Heart

Danny Phillip Dietz Jr. (January 26, 1980 – June 28, 2005) was a United States Navy SEAL who was posthumously awarded the Navy Cross and Purple Heart for heroism during Operation Red Wings in the War in Afghanistan. He was one of four SEALs ambushed by Taliban fighters in Kunar Province while on a reconnaissance mission, and one of 19 U.S. special operators killed during the operation.

== Early life and education ==
Dietz was born on January 26, 1980, in Aurora, Colorado to parents Cindy and Danny P. Dietz Sr. He was of Apache ancestry. He graduated from Heritage High School in Littleton in 1999.

== Career ==
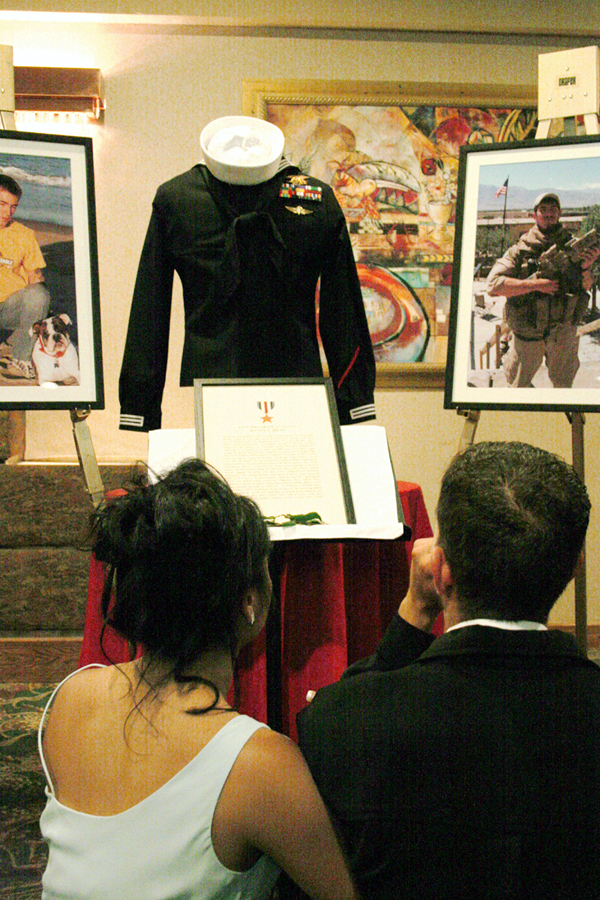
Dietz's uniform on display with his brother and sister viewing it, 2006.

Dietz enlisted in the Navy on August 31, 1999. After graduating from Recruit Training Command at Naval Station Great Lakes on November 27, 1999, he completed Gunner's Mate 'A' School there. He then transferred to Basic Underwater Demolition/SEAL training and graduated with Class 232 in 2001. Dietz attended the Basic Airborne Course at Fort Benning, Georgia, followed by SEAL Qualification Training and SEAL Delivery Vehicle (SDV) Training.

Upon checking in at SEAL Delivery Vehicle Team 2 in Virginia Beach, Virginia, on November 8, 2001, he was assigned to Task Unit Bravo as the secondary SDV pilot and the Ordnance and Engineering Department head. In April 2005, Dietz deployed with his Special Reconnaissance component to Afghanistan to support Naval Special Warfare Squadron TEN in the Global War on Terrorism.

=== Operation Red Wings ===
Operation Red Wings was a counter-insurgency operation by the United States Armed Forces to kill or capture Ahmad Shah (code name Ben Sharmak), a known terrorist and head of the militia "Mountain Tigers". The operation was carried out, on 27 June 2005, by Navy SEAL Team TEN; the four-man team was made up of 2nd Class{ Matthew G. Axelson and 2nd Class Marcus Luttrell supporting the role of snipers, while 2nd Class Danny P. Dietz and team leader Navy Lieutenant Michael P. Murphy were spotters.

The mission was compromised after goat herders stumbled upon the SEALs and reported them to the Taliban after the SEALs let them go free. An intense firefight ensued after the SEALs were ambushed by Taliban insurgents who outnumbered them twenty-five to one. Murphy went into an open clearing to get reception and call for support; he managed to reach the base, giving them the SEALs location as well as the number of enemies. Exposed to enemy fire, he was shot in the back while making the call; it was this act that awarded Murphy the Medal Of Honor posthumously. Murphy then returned to his team to continue the battle. Low on ammunition, Murphy, Axelson and Danny Dietz were killed while Luttrell was knocked unconscious by an RPG.

The Quick Reaction Force (QRF) dispatched included a team of Navy SEALs and aviators from the 160th SOAR (Night Stalkers). However, all sixteen special operators aboard one helicopter perished when the MH-47 Chinook was hit by a rocket-propelled grenade just as the SEALs were about to fast-rope at the landing zone."LT MICHAEL P. MURPHY USN". United States Navy. Archived from the original on March 16, 2016. Among the dead aboard the helicopter were Lieutenant Commander Erik S. Kristensen, the highest-ranking officer to die in the operation, and Sergeant Kip A. Jacoby, the youngest soldier to die in the operation, at the age of 21.

SEAL Marcus Luttrell was the sole survivor of SEAL Team TEN. He was aided by an Afghan villager who sheltered him and was rescued by Army Rangers six days later. Danny Dietz, Matthew Axelson and Michael Murphy were declared killed in action after their bodies were recovered on 4 July.

== Death ==
Dietz was mortally wounded after taking the brunt of the initial attack.

This led to him losing the ability to walk, and as a result, Luttrell carried him on his way up the mountain, while Dietz responded to him. A bullet penetrated the back of his head and killed him instantly; Dietz's dead weight came as a surprise to Luttrell and as a result, he fell over the edge of the mountain with Dietz's body and was seriously injured.

Dietz's body was found by a group of U.S. Air Force pararescuemen during a search and rescue operation, on July 4, 2005, and returned to the United States. Dietz was buried with full military honors at Fort Logan National Cemetery in Denver, Colorado.

== Personal life ==
Dietz is survived by his wife, Patsy, mother, Cindy, father, Dan Sr., sister Tiffany and brother Eric. Dietz was known to show appreciation toward the outdoors and he enjoyed fishing and rock climbing. He had a black belt in Taekwondo from the Korean Academy of Taekwondo.

== Awards and decorations ==
U.S. military decorations
Navy Cross
Purple Heart
Navy and Marine Corps Commendation Medal
Navy and Marine Corps Achievement Medal
Combat Action Ribbon
National Defense Service Medal with bronze service star
Afghanistan Campaign Medal
Global War on Terrorism Expeditionary Medal
Global War on Terrorism Service Medal
Navy Sea Service Deployment Ribbon

U.S. badges, patches and tabs
Naval Special Warfare insignia
Navy and Marine Corps Parachutist Insignia

=== Navy Cross ===
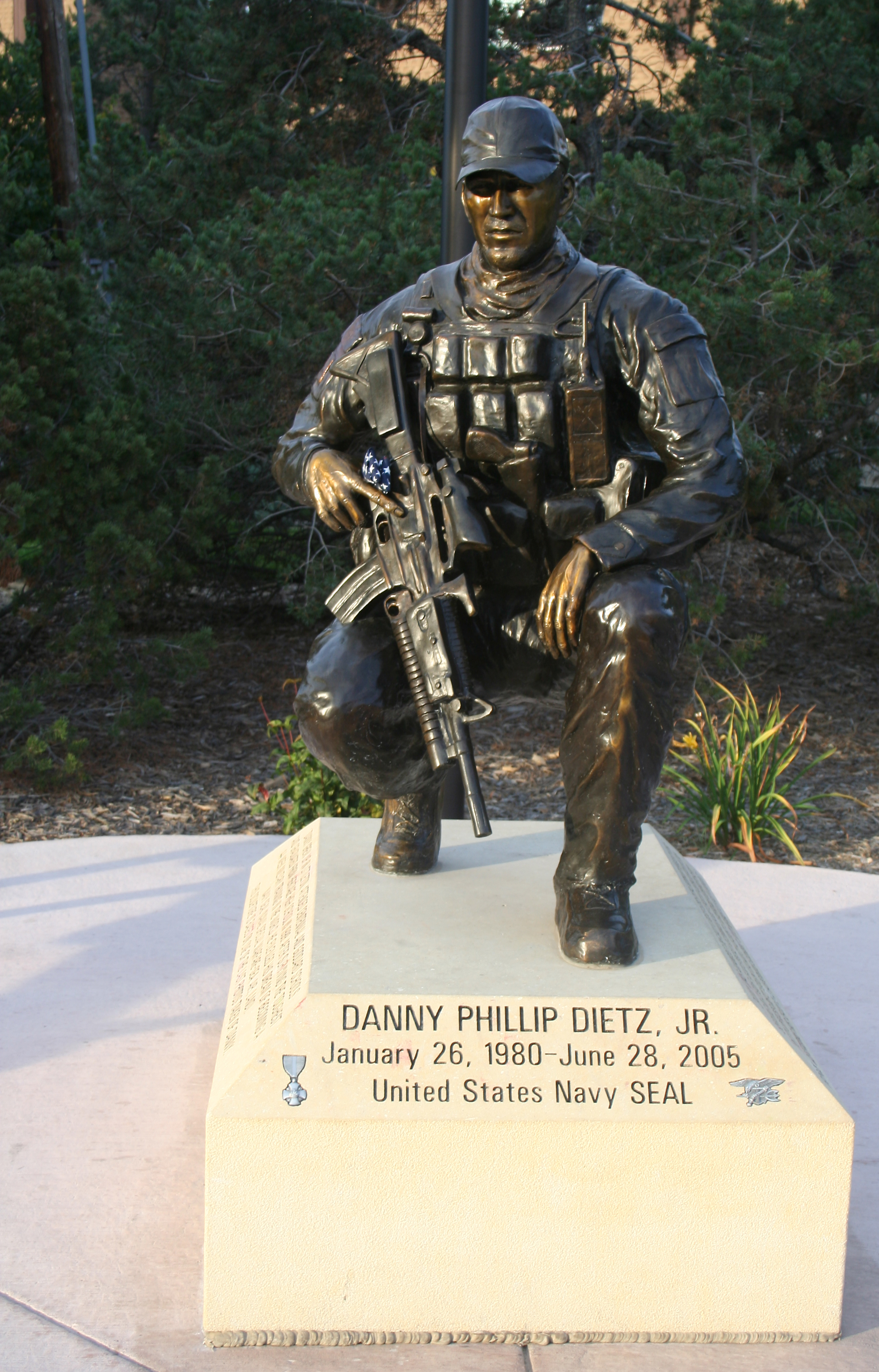
A close-up image of Dietz's statue on display

On September 13, 2006, Dietz was posthumously awarded the Navy Cross by Navy Secretary Donald C. Winter.

==== Citation ====

For extraordinary heroism in actions against the enemy while serving in a four-man Special Reconnaissance element with SEAL Delivery Vehicle Team ONE, Naval Special Warfare Task unit, Afghanistan from 27 to 28 June 2005. Petty Officer Dietz demonstrated extraordinary heroism in the face of grave danger in the vicinity of Asadabad, Kunar Province, Afghanistan. Operating in the middle of an enemy-controlled area, in extremely rugged terrain, his Special Reconnaissance element was tasked with locating a high-level Anti-Coalition Militia leader, in support of a follow-on direct action mission to disrupt enemy activity. On 28 June 2005, the element was spotted by Anti-Coalition Militia sympathizers, who immediately revealed their position to the militia fighters. As a result, the element directly encountered the enemy. Demonstrating exceptional resolve and fully understanding the gravity of the situation and his responsibility to his teammates, Petty Officer Dietz fought valiantly against the numerically superior and positionally advantaged enemy force. Remaining behind in a hailstorm of enemy fire, Petty Officer Dietz was wounded by enemy fire. Despite his injuries, he bravely fought on, valiantly defending his teammates and himself in a harrowing gunfight, until he was mortally wounded. By his undaunted courage in the face of heavy enemy fire, and absolute devotion to his teammates, Petty Officer Dietz will long be remembered for the role he played in the Global War on Terrorism. Petty Officer Dietz's courageous and selfless heroism, exceptional professional skill, and utmost devotion to duty reflected great credit upon him and were in keeping with the highest traditions of the United States Naval Service. He gallantly gave his life for the cause of freedom.

== Legacy ==
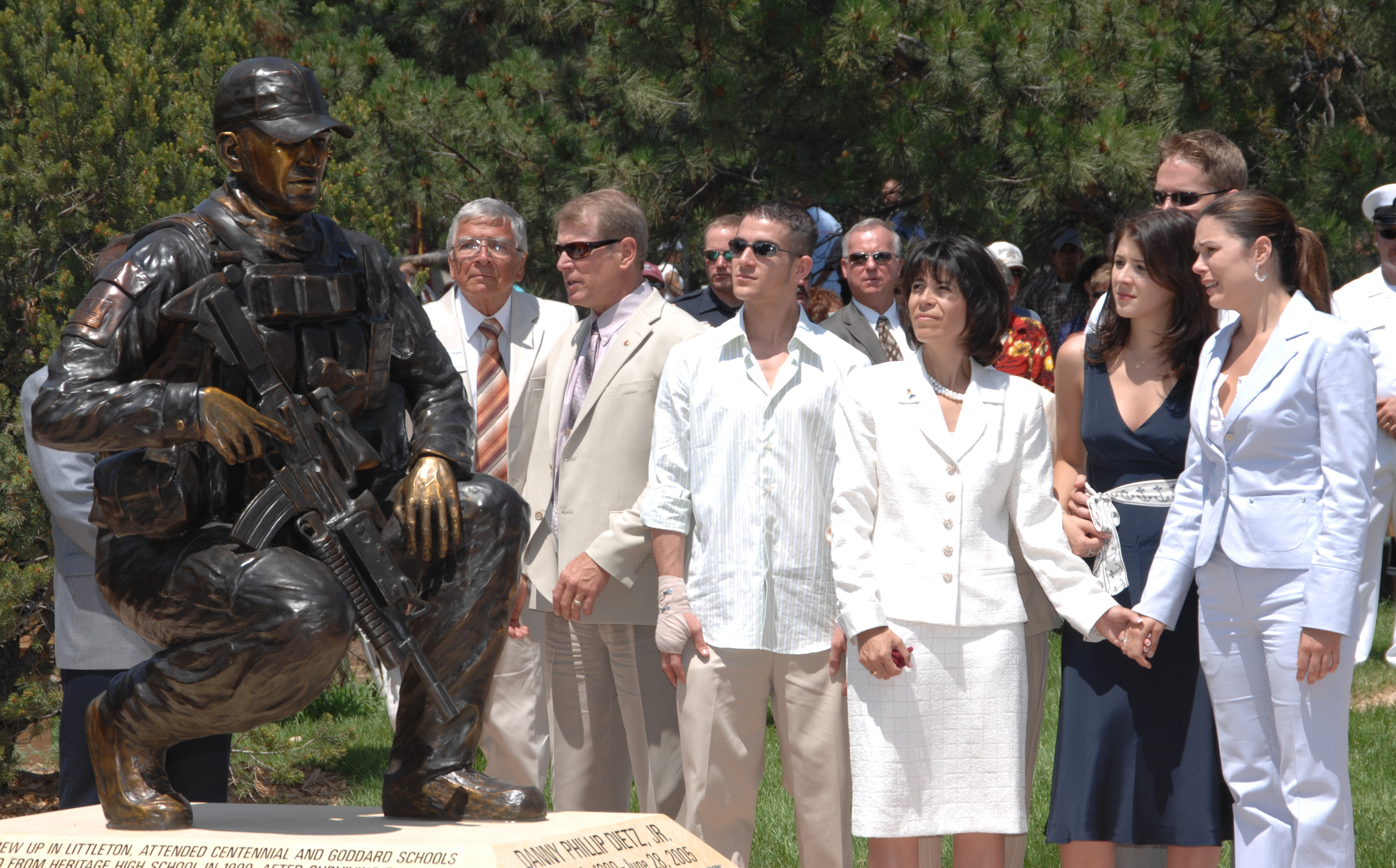
A picture of Dietz's statue unveiled in 2007 with his family viewing it; his wife is on the corner right followed by his sister, mother, brother and father.

On July 4, 2007, the town of Littleton, Colorado erected a bronze lifesize statue of Dietz holding his rifle in a 'parade-rest' position on one knee. It contained the same statement on the Navy Cross citation.

On August 18, 2009, the span of South Santa Fe Drive between Interstate 25 and Colorado State Highway 470 was named Navy SEAL Danny Dietz Memorial Highway in his honor.

Starting in 2010, the Danny Dietz Memorial Day Classic is a fundraiser / rodeo event held the weekend of Memorial Day at the Fort Bend County Fairgrounds in Rosenberg, Texas.

For the 2013 film Lone Survivor, which covered the events of Operation Red Wings, Dietz was portrayed by actor Emile Hirsch.

== See also ==
- List of people from Littleton, Colorado
