= Weapons technician (US Navy rating) =

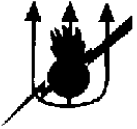
Weapons Technician Rating Insignia

Weapons technician was a United States Navy rating for enlisted personnel established in 1986. The weapons technician rating, abbreviated WT, was disestablished in 1995 concurrent with the removal of tactical nuclear weapons from the fleet.

The U.S. Navy created a "nuclear weaponsman" (NW) rate for enlisted personnel in 1958. In 1961, it created the "gunner's mate technician" rating for enlisted personnel who previously held the NW rate. The gunner's mate technician rating in turn became the "weapons technician" rate in 1986.
