= Matthew Axelson =

Recipient of the Navy Cross

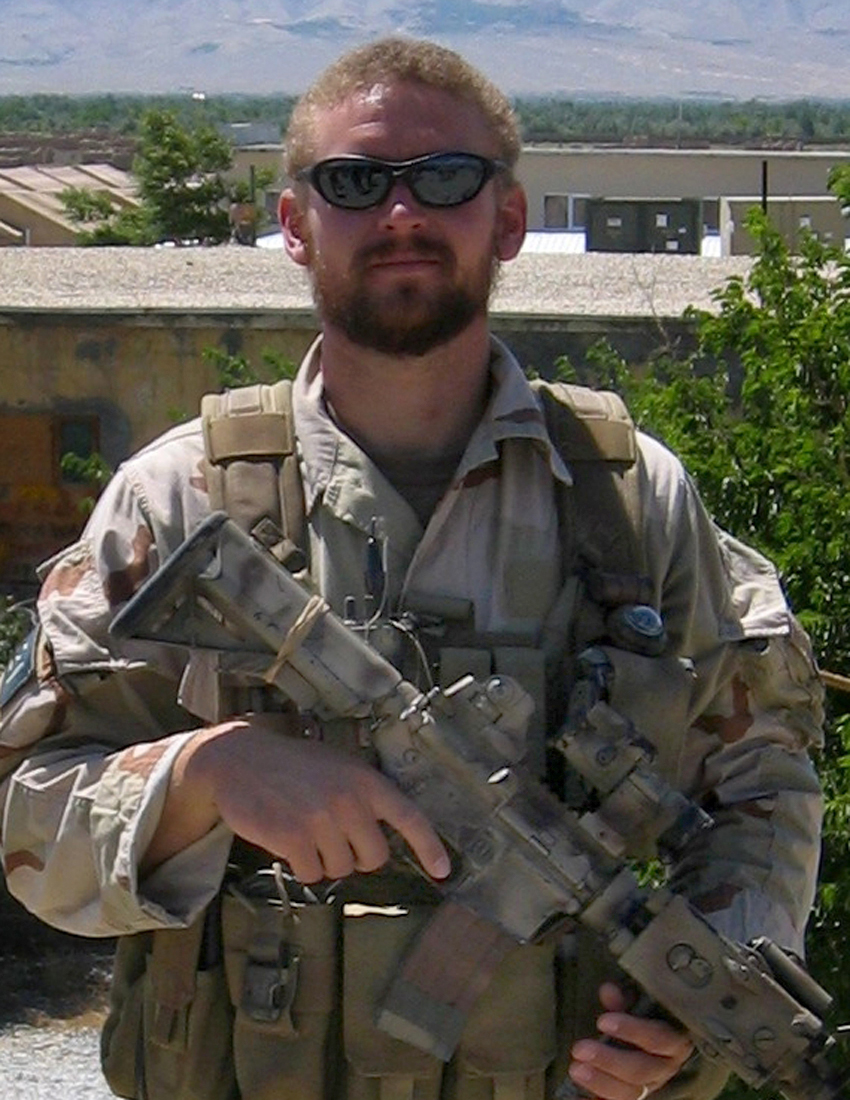
- Axelson in Afghanistan 2005
- Born: Matthew Gene Axelson; June 25, 1976; Cupertino, California U.S.
- Died: June 28, 2005 (aged 29); Kunar Province, Afghanistan
- Burial place: Glen Oaks Memorial Park, Chico, California, U.S.
- Spouse: Cindy Oji Axelson (m. 2003–2005)
- Military career
- Allegiance: United States of America
- Branch: United States Navy
- Service years: 2000–2005
- Rank: Sonar technician, Second class
- Nickname: "Axe"
- Unit: U.S. Navy SEALs: SDV Team 1
- Conflicts: War in Afghanistan: Operation Red Wings †
- Awards: Navy Cross; Purple Heart

Matthew Gene "Axe" Axelson (June 25, 1976 – June 28, 2005) was an enlisted United States Navy SEAL who was awarded the U.S. Navy's second highest decoration, the Navy Cross and the Purple Heart, for his actions during the War in Afghanistan. Serving as a sniper in the operation, Axelson was killed in action during the firefight phase of Operation Red Wings.

== Personal life ==
Axelson was born on June 25, 1976, in Cupertino, California, to parents Donna and Cordell Axelson. He graduated from Monta Vista High School in 1994, attended San Diego State University for a year and graduated from the California State University Chico with a degree in political science. Axelson's brother, Jeffery, wrote a book about him. Axelson married Cindy Oji in 2003, in Sacramento, California.

== Military service and death ==
Axelson enlisted in the United States Navy in December 2000, and completed basic training at Naval Station Great Lakes. After finishing Sonar Technician Surface (STG) "A" School, he undertook Basic Underwater Demolition/SEAL training (BUD/S) and graduated with Class 237 in Coronado, California. After BUD/S, Axelson went to the Army Airborne School, completed SEAL Qualification Training and then attended SEAL Delivery Vehicle School. He reported to SEAL Delivery Vehicle Team 1 in December 2002, in Hawaii. He deployed to Afghanistan in April 2005.

=== Operation Red Wings ===
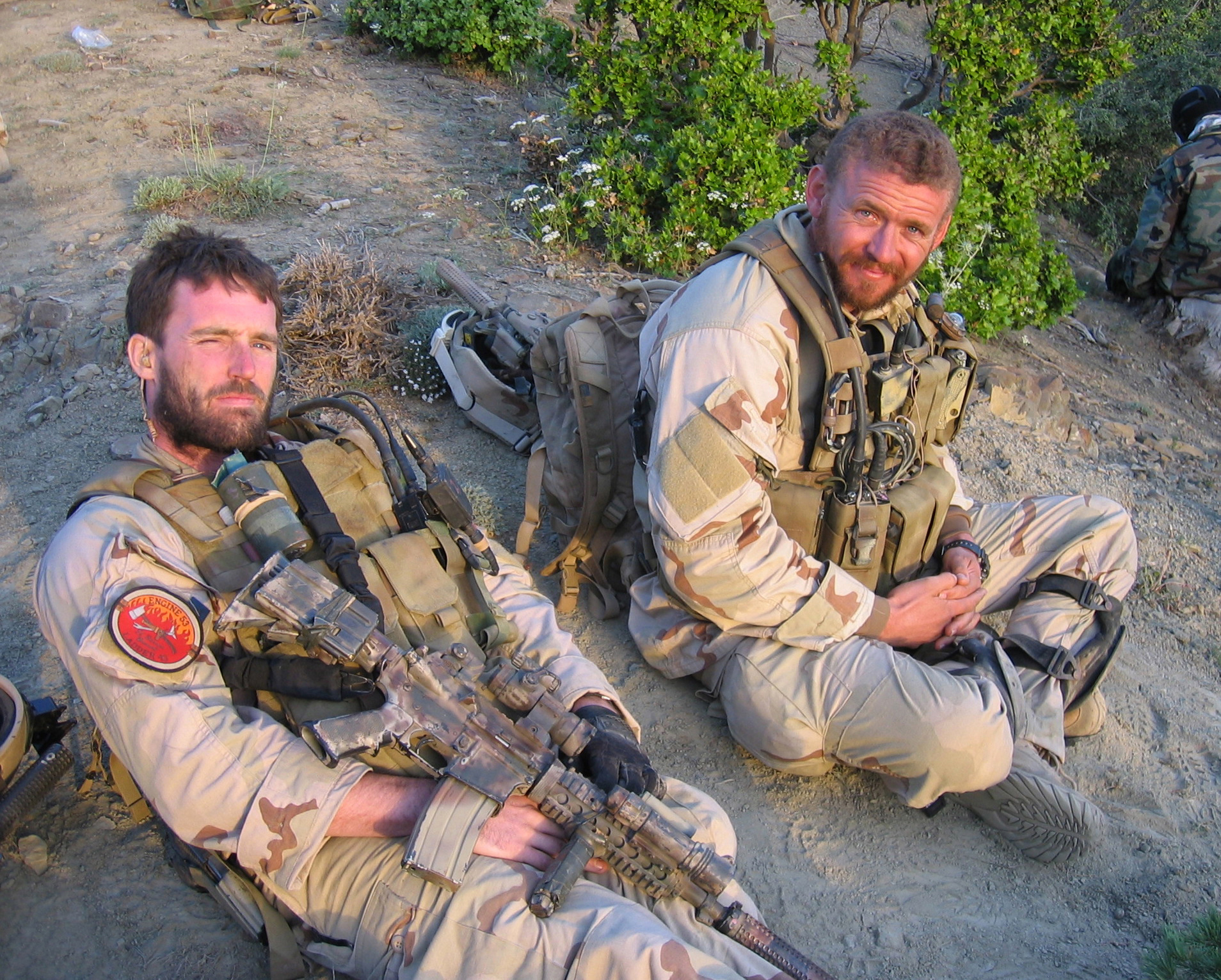
Axelson (right) with Michael Murphy in Afghanistan, 2005.

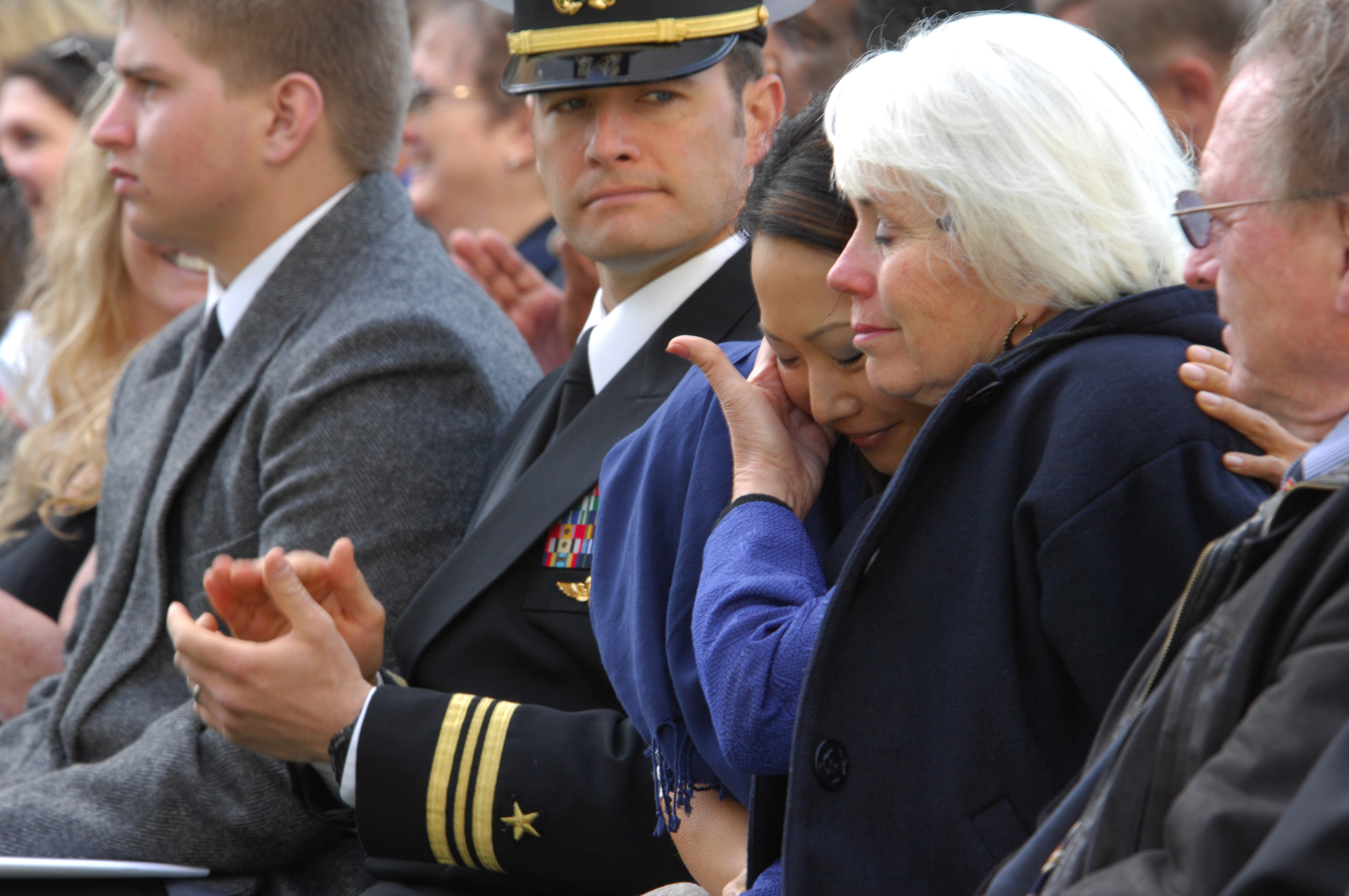
Axelson's mother, comforting his wife at the honoring ceremony, 2009.

Operation Red Wings was a counter-insurgency operation carried out by the United States Armed Forces in Kunar Province, Afghanistan, in 2005. The objective of the operation was to kill or capture Ahmad Shah (code name Ben Sharmak), a known terrorist and head of the "Mountain Tigers" militia group. During the operation, Axelson and Marcus Luttrell were assigned as snipers while Danny Dietz and Michael P. Murphy served as spotters.

The mission was compromised after goat herders discovered the SEALs and reported their location to the Taliban in the village. An intense firefight ensued and Dietz was killed as a result of a gunshot wound to the head, becoming the first casualty of the operation. After Murphy moved to a clearing to get reception and call for support, he was shot multiple times and killed, while Axelson died as a result of bullet wounds and fragmentation wounds from an RPG blast as he tried to escape.

The quick reaction force that was dispatched in response to a request from Murphy, consisted of eight Navy SEALs and eight 160th SOAR Night Stalker crewmen. As the aircraft arrived onsite and the SEALs attempted to fast rope, an RPG hit their Chinook causing it to crash. All 16 personnel aboard were killed.

Axelson had been severely wounded after taking the brunt of the initial attack and the fall with his teammates. After regrouping with the team, he began firing back and hours later he suffered a gunshot wound to the head, by this point of time he had been shot in several places including his chest and head. On July 10, 2005, Axelson's body was discovered 3 miles away from the initial RPG explosion, by a group of SEALs during a search and rescue operation and returned to the United States. Axelson was buried with full military honors at Glen Oaks Memorial Park in Chico, California.

== Awards and decorations ==
=== Navy Cross ===
On September 13, 2006, Axelson was posthumously awarded the Navy Cross by Navy Secretary Donald C. Winter.

==== Citation ====

The President of the United States of America takes pride in presenting the Navy Cross (Posthumously) to Sonar Technician Second Class Matthew Gene Axelson, United States Navy, for extraordinary heroism in actions against the enemy while serving in a four-man Special Reconnaissance element with SEAL Delivery Vehicle Team ONE, Naval Special Warfare Task Unit, Afghanistan from 27 to 28 June 2005. Petty Officer Axelson demonstrated extraordinary heroism in the face of grave danger in the vicinity of Asadabad, Konar Province, Afghanistan. Operating in the middle of an enemy-controlled area, in extremely rugged terrain, his Special Reconnaissance element was tasked with locating a high-level Anti-Coalition Militia leader, in support of a follow-on direct action mission to disrupt enemy activity. On 28 June 2005, the element was spotted by Anti-Coalition Militia sympathizers, who immediately revealed their position to the militia fighters. As a result, the element directly encountered the enemy. Demonstrating exceptional resolve and fully understanding the gravity of the situation, Petty Officer Axelson's element bravely engaged the militia, who held both a numerical and positional advantage. The ensuing firefight resulted in numerous enemy personnel killed, with several of the Navy members suffering casualties. Ignoring his injuries and demonstrating exceptional composure, Petty Officer Axelson advised the teammate closest to him to escape while he provided cover fire. With total disregard for his own life and thinking only of his teammate's survival, he continued to attack the enemy, eliminating additional militia fighters, until he was mortally wounded by enemy fire. A champion of freedom, Petty Officer Axelson will be remembered for his self-sacrificing actions in the continuing Global War on Terrorism. By his undaunted courage, fortitude under fire, and unwavering dedication to duty, Petty Officer Axelson reflected great credit upon himself and upheld the highest traditions of the United States Naval Service. He gallantly gave his life for the cause of freedom.

Axelson's awards include:

U.S. military decorations
Navy Cross
Purple Heart
Navy and Marine Corps Commendation Medal
Combat Action Ribbon
Navy Unit Commendation
Navy Good Conduct Medal
National Defense Service Medal
Afghanistan Campaign Medal w/ 1 Service star
Global War on Terrorism Expeditionary Medal
Global War on Terrorism Service Medal
Navy and Marine Corps Sea Service Deployment Ribbon
NATO Medal
Navy Expert Rifleman Medal
Navy Expert Pistol Shot Medal

U.S. badges, patches and tabs
Naval Special Warfare insignia
Navy and Marine Corps Parachutist Insignia

== Legacy ==
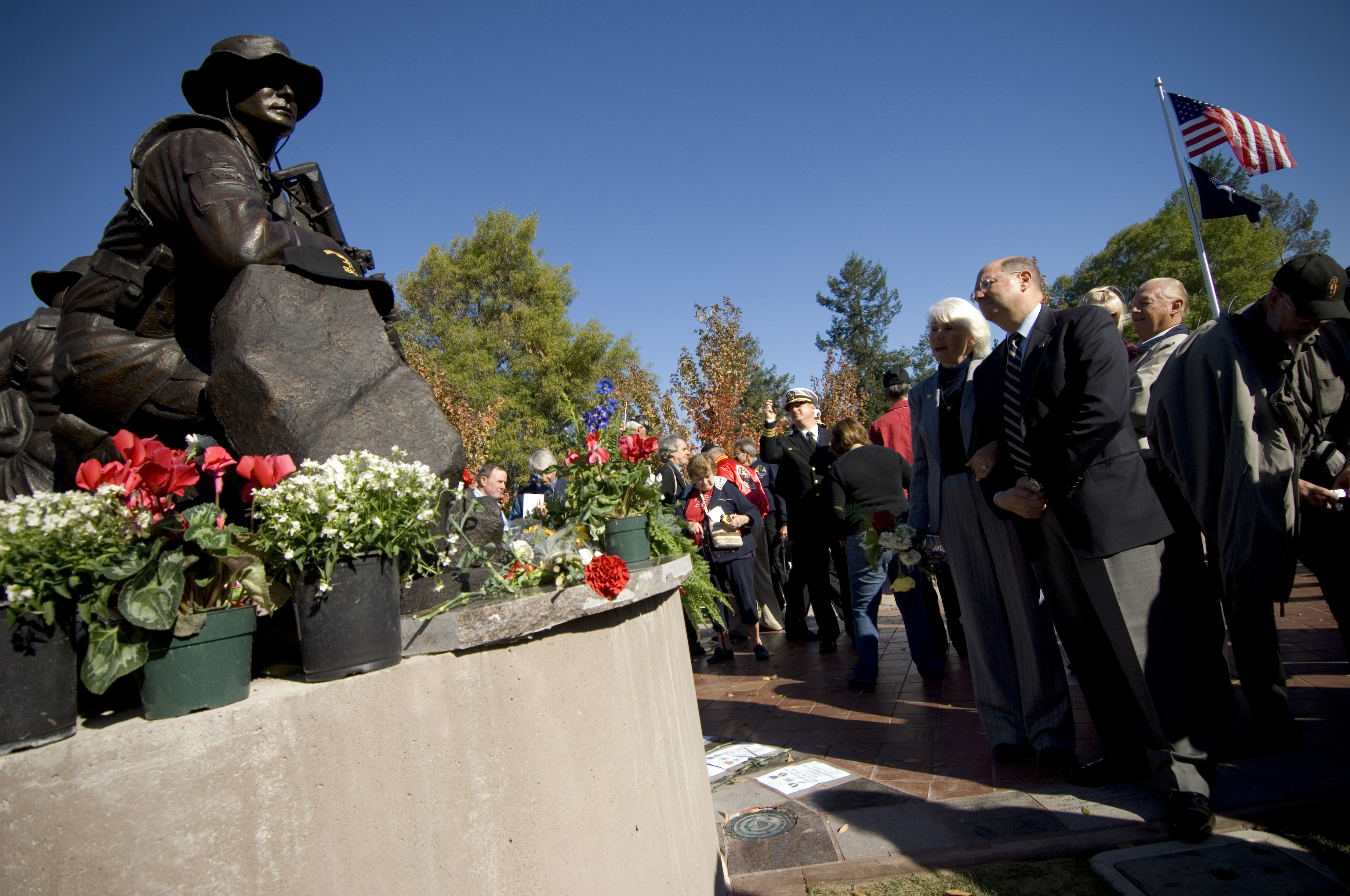
A picture of Axelson and Suh's statue unveiled in 2007 with his family viewing it.

On November 11, 2007, the town of Cupertino, California, erected a bronze lifesize statue of Axelson and fellow SEAL James Suh (also killed in action during Operation Red Wings), holding their rifles in a defensive kneeling position. The Navy Cross citation was replicated on the memorial.

On November 3, 2015, Naval Base San Diego renamed their Pacific Beacon housing complex to The Axelson Building and dedicated a display box in the building's lobby which houses some of Axelson's possessions.

On November 13, 2015, Axelson was recognized as an alumnus at San Diego State University and included on the university's war memorial.

For the 2013 film Lone Survivor, which covered the events of Operation Red Wing, Axelson was portrayed by actor Ben Foster.

A bill was proposed in October 2019 to rename the post office in Cupertino, California, to "Petty Officer 2nd Class (SEAL) Matthew G. Axelson Post Office Building", the bill had passed on 14 September 2020 and the building was renamed.

In 2016, Axelson Tactical, a firearm company started in Axelson's honor, unveiled a replica rifle similar to what Axelson had carried at the time he was killed in action in June 2005. On January 19, 2016, Axelson Tactical and Team Never Quit Ammunition, announced a raffle to giveaway an Axelson replica rifle and a 1,000 rounds of ammunition to raise money for the Special Operations Wounded Warriors charity.
