= Michael P. Murphy =

United States Navy Medal of Honor recipient (1976–2005)

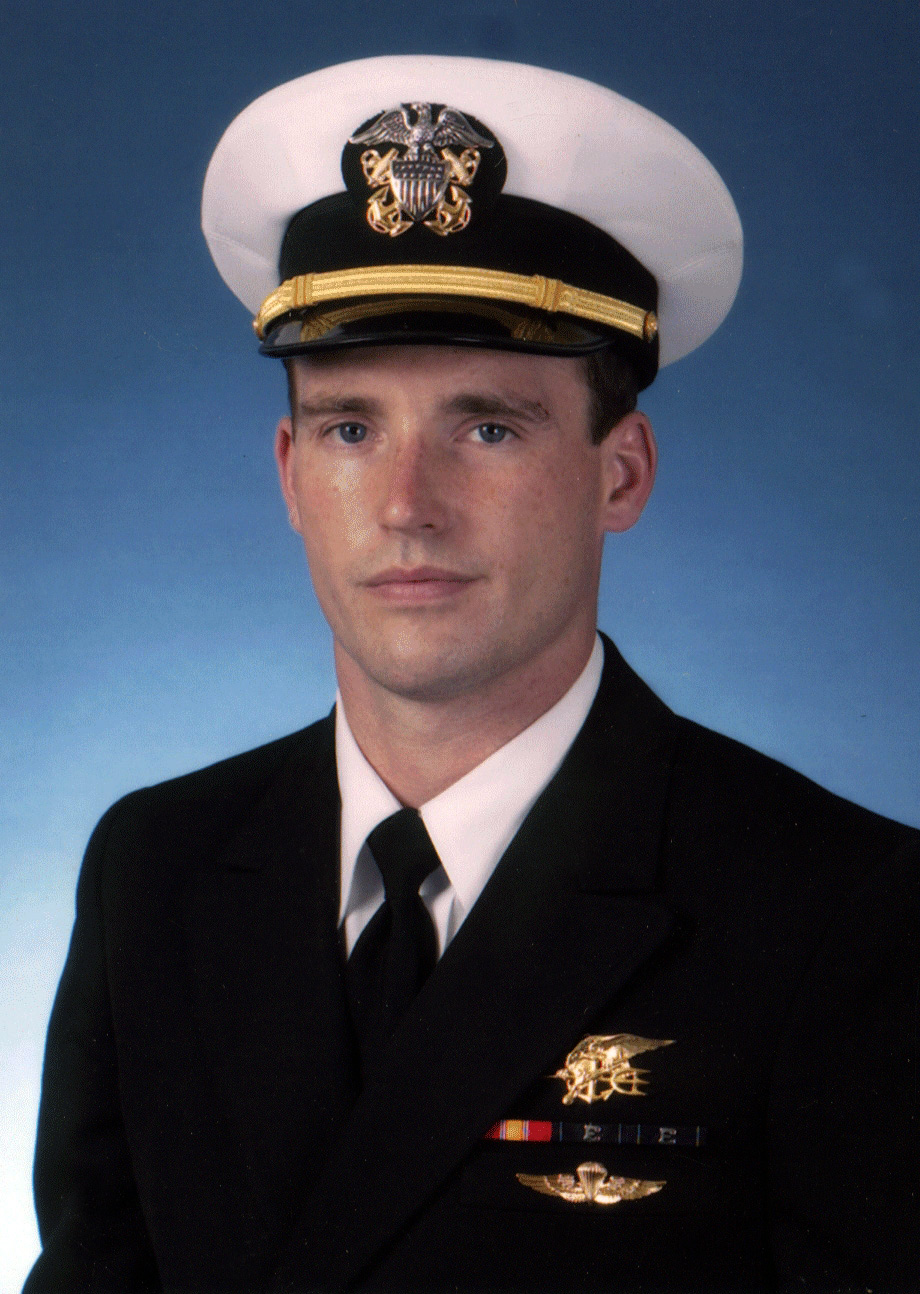
- Lieutenant Michael P. Murphy
- Born: May 7, 1976; Smithtown, New York, U.S.
- Died: June 28, 2005 (aged 29); Kunar Province, Afghanistan
- Burial place: Calverton National Cemetery; Calverton, New York
- Alma mater: Pennsylvania State University
- Military career
- Allegiance: United States
- Branch: United States Navy
- Service years: 2000–2005
- Rank: Lieutenant
- Nicknames: "Murph", "Mikey", "The Protector"
- Units: United States Navy SEALs; SDV Team 1
- Conflicts: War in Afghanistan; Operation Red Wings †
- Awards: Medal of Honor; Purple Heart

Michael Patrick Murphy (May 7, 1976 – June 28, 2005) was a United States Navy SEAL officer who was awarded the U.S. military's highest decoration, the Medal of Honor, for his actions during the War in Afghanistan. He was the first member of the United States Navy (USN) to receive the award since the Vietnam War. His other posthumous awards include the Silver Star Medal (Note: Uncertain if the Silver Star was upgraded to the Medal of Honor or it was in addition to) and the Purple Heart.

Michael Murphy was born and raised in Suffolk County, New York. He graduated from Pennsylvania State University with honors and dual degrees in political science and psychology. After college he accepted a commission in the USN and became a United States Navy SEAL in July 2002. After participating in several war on terrorism missions, he was killed on June 28, 2005, after his team was compromised and surrounded by Taliban forces near Asadabad, Afghanistan.

The USN ship USS Michael Murphy and several civilian and military buildings have been named in his honor.

== Early life and education ==
Murphy was born on May 7, 1976, in Smithtown, New York, to Irish American parents Maureen and Daniel Murphy, a former assistant Suffolk County district attorney and a wounded veteran of the Vietnam War. He was raised in Patchogue, New York. He attended Saxton Middle School, where he played youth soccer and pee-wee football, with his father serving as his coach. In high school, he continued playing sports, and took a summer job as a lifeguard at the Brookhaven town beach in Lake Ronkonkoma, New York. He returned to the job every summer throughout his college years.

Murphy was known to his friends as "Murph" and as "The Protector" in his high school years. In 8th grade, he protected a child with special needs who was being shoved into a locker by a group of boys, ending with Murphy physically pulling the attackers away from the child. This was the only time the school principal had to notify Murphy's parents of a 'disciplinary' issue; his parents later reported that they "couldn't have been prouder". He also protected a homeless man who was being attacked while collecting cans. He chased away the attackers and helped the man pick up his cans.

In 1994, Murphy graduated from Patchogue-Medford High School and left to attend The Pennsylvania State University (Penn State). He graduated in 1998 with a double major in political science and psychology. Murphy was engaged to his college sweetheart, Heather Duggan, and their wedding was scheduled for November 2005.

== Career ==
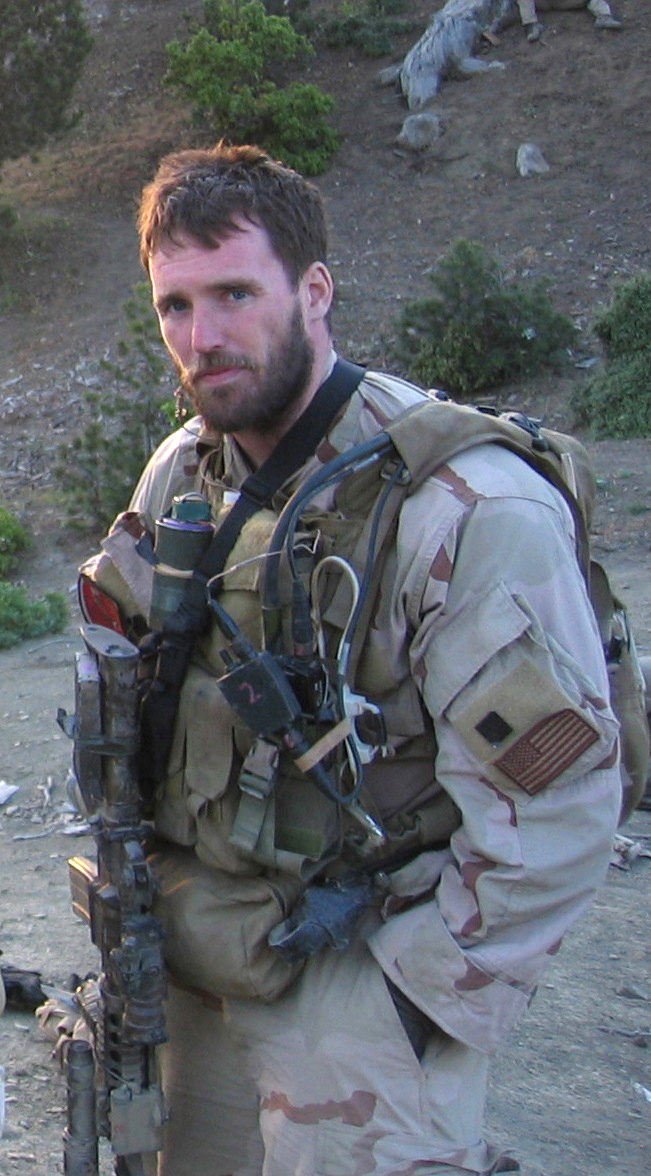
Murphy in Afghanistan

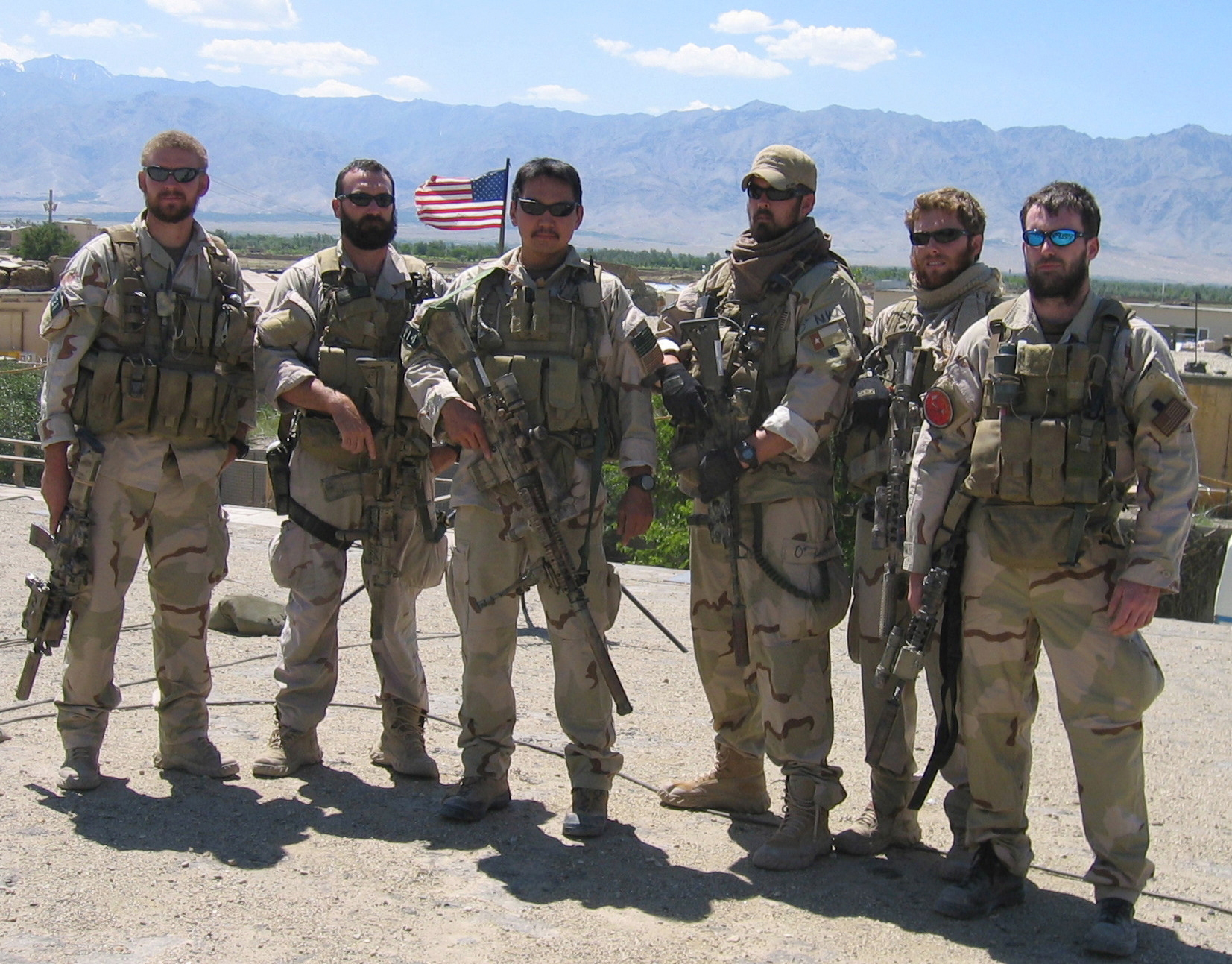
Navy SEALs of Operation Red Wings, with Murphy on the far right

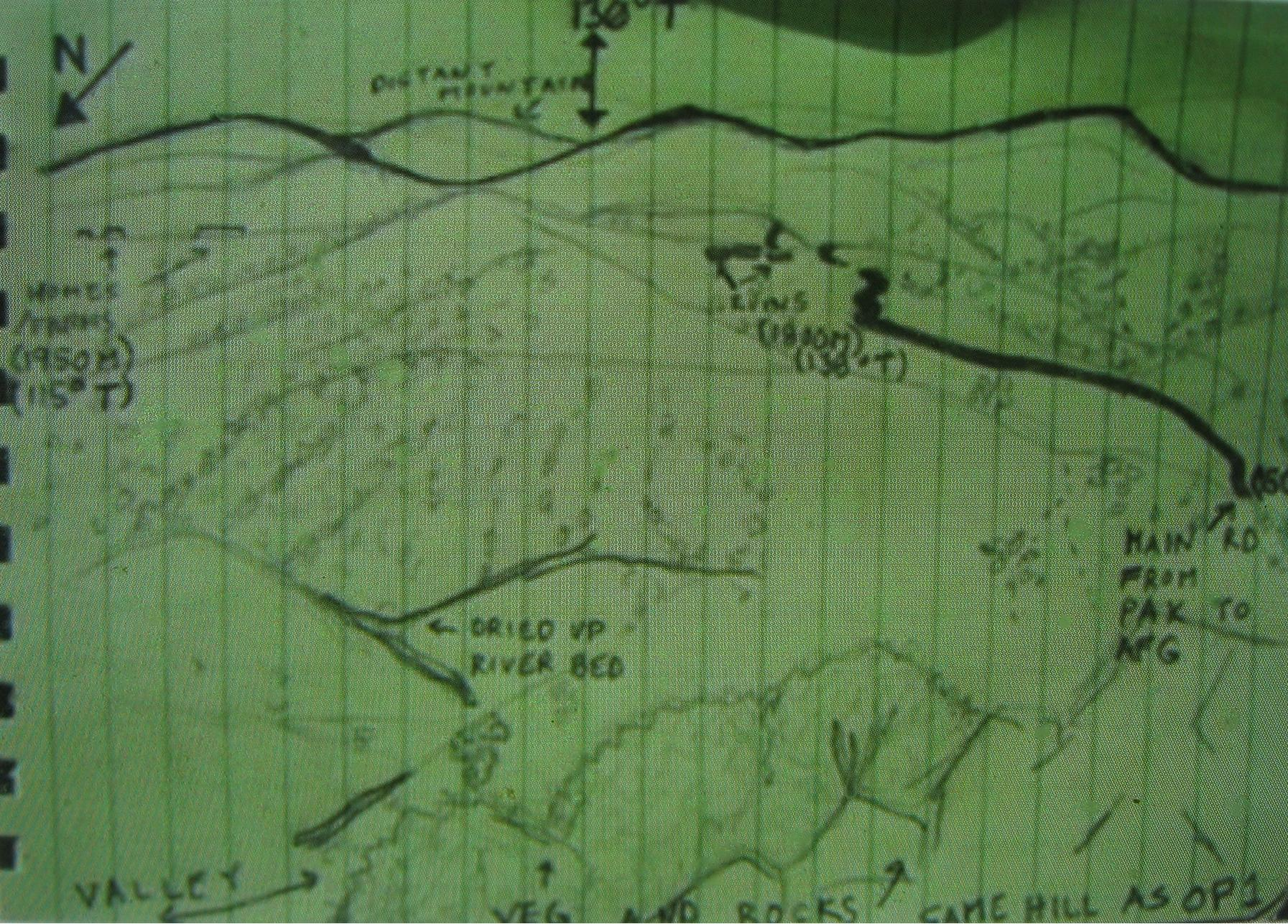
The map given to the U.S. Navy SEALs detailing their mission.

After graduating from Penn State, Murphy applied and was accepted to several law schools, but decided to attend SEAL mentoring sessions at the United States Merchant Marine Academy. In September 2000, he accepted an appointment to the USN's Officer Candidate School in Pensacola, Florida. On December 13 of that year, he was commissioned as an Ensign in the Navy and began Basic Underwater Demolition/SEAL (BUD/S) training in Coronado, California, in January 2001, eventually graduating with Class 236 in November 2001.

Upon graduation from BUD/S, he attended the United States Army Airborne School, SEAL Qualification Training, and SEAL Delivery Vehicle (SDV) school. Murphy earned his SEAL Trident and checked on board SDV Team ONE (SDVT-1) in Pearl Harbor, Hawaii, in July 2002. In October 2002, he deployed with Foxtrot Platoon to Jordan as the liaison officer for Exercise Early Victor. Following his tour with SDVT-1, Murphy was assigned to Special Operations Command Central (SOCCENT) in Florida and deployed to Qatar in support of Operation Iraqi Freedom. After returning from Qatar, he was deployed to Djibouti to assist in the operational planning of future SDV missions.

=== Combat in Afghanistan ===
In early 2005, Murphy was assigned to SEAL Delivery Vehicle Team ONE as officer in charge of Alpha Platoon and deployed to Afghanistan in support of Operation Enduring Freedom. While deployed, Murphy was known for wearing the patch of FDNY Engine Co. 53, Ladder Co. 43 ("El Barrio's Bravest") in remembrance of the terrorist attacks on September 11th and an FDNY friend of his who had died that day. Shortly before deploying to Afghanistan, Murphy had asked for several patches from a close friend of his who had been assigned to the station.

==== Operation Red Wings ====
Operation Red Wings was a counter-insurgent mission in Kunar province, Afghanistan, involving a four man special reconnaissance team of United States Navy SEALs. Murphy and two other SEALs in the team, Danny Dietz and Matthew Axelson, were killed in the fighting, in addition to 16 other U.S. special operations members, who were killed when their helicopter was shot down while attempting to extract the SEAL recon team. Prior to a helicopter being shot down in 2011, Operation Red Wings was both the largest loss of life for U.S. forces in Afghanistan since the invasion began and the largest loss for the SEALs since the Vietnam War.

Murphy was the commander of the four-man reconnaissance team made up of himself, Danny Dietz, Matthew Axelson, and Marcus Luttrell. The team was tasked with conducting surveillance on a top Taliban leader, Ahmad Shah (code name Ben Sharmak), who commanded a group of insurgents known as the "Mountain Tigers", west of Asadabad. They were dropped off by helicopter in a remote, mountainous area east of Asadabad in Kunar Province, near the Pakistan border. After an initially successful infiltration, local goat herders stumbled upon the SEALs' location. Unable to verify any hostile intent from the herders, the team cut them loose. Hostile locals, possibly the goat herders they released, alerted nearby Taliban forces, who surrounded and attacked the small team. At the cost of his own life, Murphy was able to get a message out to friendly forces of their situation, which prompted reinforcements flown in on an MH-47 Chinook helicopter. The helicopter was shot down by an RPG, killing all 16 personnel aboard; eight were SEALs, the other eight were 160th SOAR.

Murphy, Dietz, and Axelson were killed in the action. Luttrell was the only U.S. survivor and was eventually rescued, after having wandered in the mountains before being taken in by friendly local Afghan villagers. All three of Murphy's men were awarded the Navy's second-highest honor, the Navy Cross, for their part in the battle; alongside Murphy's Medal of Honor, their team became the most decorated in Navy SEAL history.

== Death ==
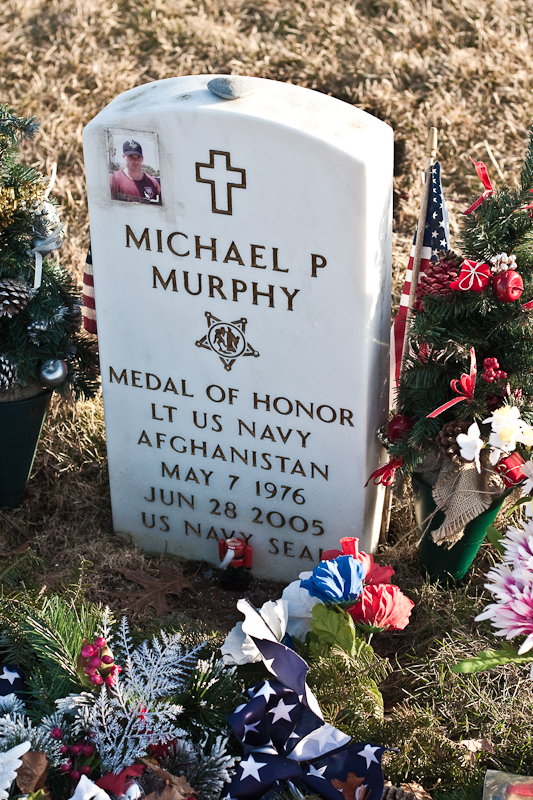
Murphy's grave at Calverton National Cemetery

Murphy was killed on 28 June 2005 during Operation Red Wings. He had left cover and moved to a clearing away from the mountains, exposing himself to enemy fire in order to obtain a signal for his satellite phone to contact headquarters, relay the situation and request help. He dropped the satellite phone after being shot but managed to pick the phone back up and finish the call. Murphy signed off saying "Thank you", then continued fighting from his exposed position until he died from his wounds.

On 4 July 2005, Murphy's remains were recovered by a group of American soldiers during a combat search and rescue operation and returned to the United States. On 13 July, Murphy was buried with full military honors at Calverton National Cemetery.

== Awards and decorations ==
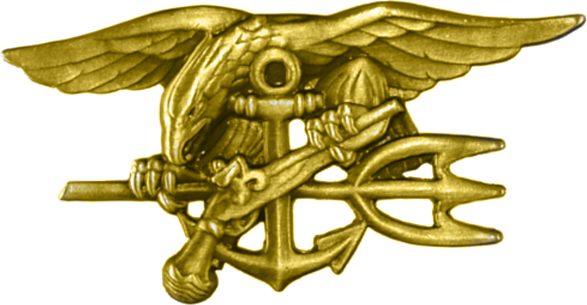

Special Warfare Insignia (Note: This footnote applies to all awards listed in the table.)
1st row	Medal of Honor		
2nd row	Silver Star	Purple Heart Medal	Joint Service Commendation Medal
3rd row	Navy and Marine Corps Commendation Medal	Combat Action Ribbon	National Defense Service Medal
4th row	Afghanistan Campaign Medal w/ 1 campaign star	Global War on Terrorism Expeditionary Medal	Global War on Terrorism Service Medal
5th row	Navy Sea Service Deployment Ribbon	Navy Rifle Marksmanship Medal w/ expert device	Navy Pistol Marksmanship Medal w/ expert device
Navy and Marine Corps Parachutist Insignia

=== Medal of Honor ===
On 11 October 2007 the Bush administration announced Murphy would be presented the Medal of Honor, awarded posthumously, during a ceremony at the White House on 22 October 2007.

The Medal of Honor is the highest military decoration awarded by the United States government and is bestowed on a member of the armed forces who distinguishes himself "...conspicuously by gallantry and intrepidity at the risk of his life above and beyond the call of duty while engaged in an action against an enemy of the United States..." Due to the nature of the award, it is commonly presented posthumously.

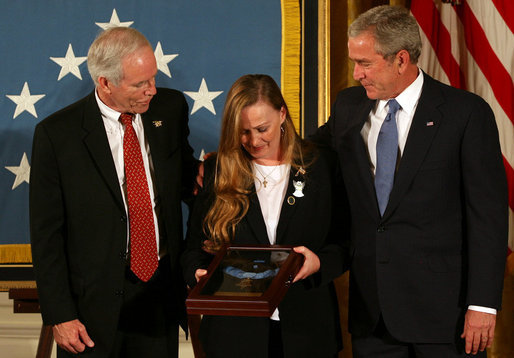
The parents of Lt. Murphy receive his medal from President Bush.

President George W. Bush presented Murphy's Medal of Honor to his parents on 22 October 2007.

==== Citation ====
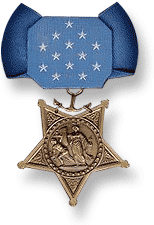

For conspicuous gallantry and intrepidity at the risk of his life and above and beyond the call of duty as the leader of a special reconnaissance element with Naval Special Warfare task unit Afghanistan on 27 and 28 June 2005.
While leading a mission to locate a high-level anti-coalition militia leader, Lieutenant Murphy demonstrated extraordinary heroism in the face of grave danger in the vicinity of Asadabad, Kunar Province, Afghanistan. On 28 June 2005, operating in an extremely rugged enemy-controlled area, Lieutenant Murphy's team was discovered by anti-coalition militia sympathizers, who revealed their position to Taliban fighters. As a result, between 30 and 40 enemy fighters besieged his four member team. Demonstrating exceptional resolve, Lieutenant Murphy valiantly led his men in engaging the large enemy force. The ensuing fierce firefight resulted in numerous enemy casualties, as well as the wounding of all four members of the team. Ignoring his own wounds and demonstrating exceptional composure, Lieutenant Murphy continued to lead and encourage his men. When the primary communicator fell mortally wounded, Lieutenant Murphy repeatedly attempted to call for assistance for his beleaguered teammates. Realizing the impossibility of communicating in the extreme terrain, and in the face of almost certain death, he fought his way into open terrain to gain a better position to transmit a call. This deliberate, heroic act deprived him of cover, exposing him to direct enemy fire. Finally achieving contact with his headquarters, Lieutenant Murphy maintained his exposed position while he provided his location and requested immediate support for his team. In his final act of bravery, he continued to engage the enemy until he was mortally wounded, gallantly giving his life for his country and for the cause of freedom. By his selfless leadership, Lieutenant Murphy reflected great credit upon himself and upheld the highest traditions of the United States Naval Service.

== Legacy ==
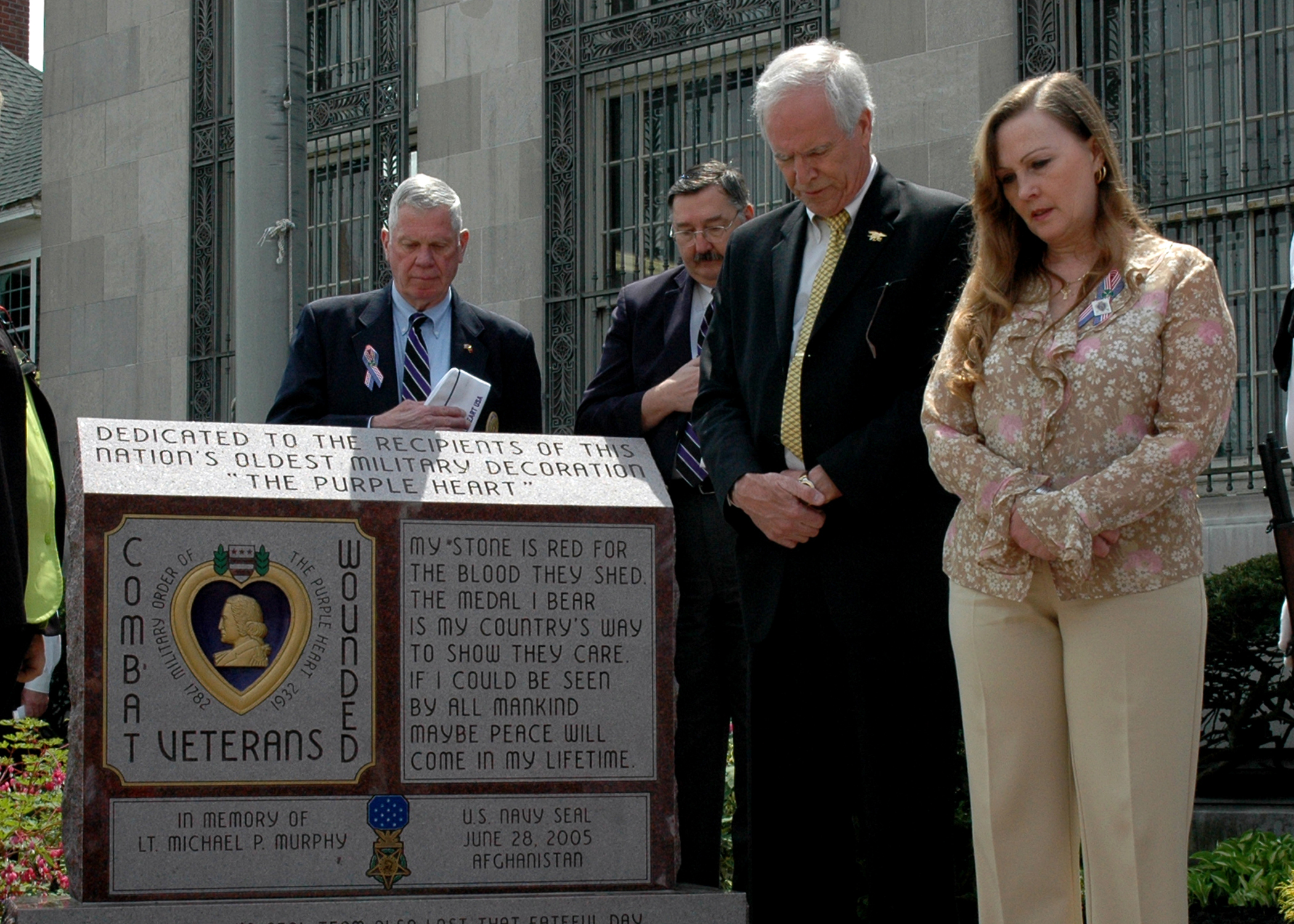
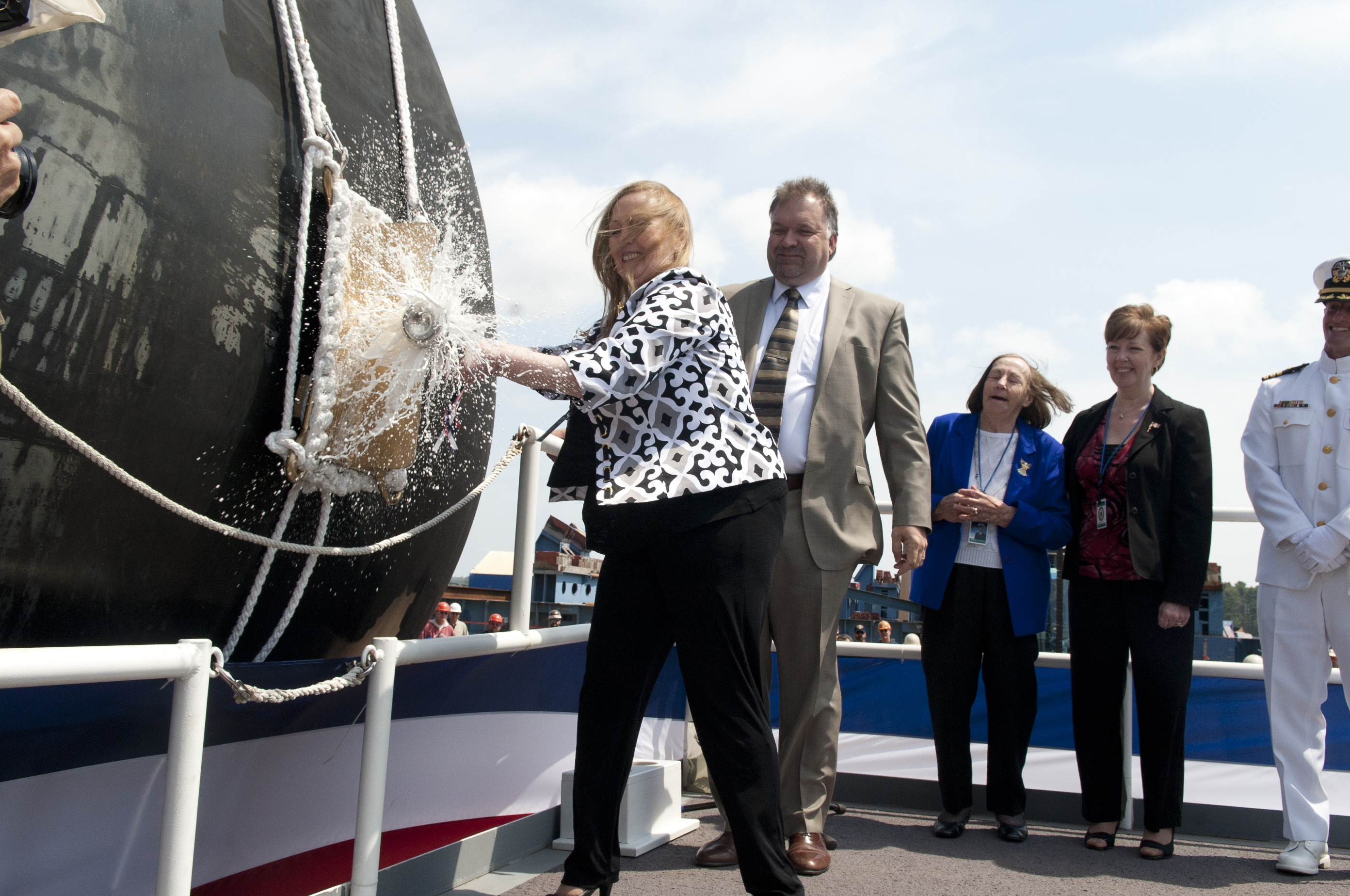
Murphy's parents stand next to a monument in front of the Lieutenant Michael P. Murphy Post Office in Patchogue, New York (left); Maureen Murphy breaks a champagne bottle to christen the ship named after her son (right)

During his military career, Murphy received 11 different military decorations, including the Medal of Honor, Purple Heart, Joint Service Commendation Medal, and Navy Commendation Medal. Since his death, the high school he attended, a post office in his home town, a park and a guided missile destroyer, the USS Michael Murphy (DDG-112), have been named in his honor.

In addition to the Medal of Honor, his military awards, and his inscription on the Hall of Heroes in the Pentagon, Murphy has received several other honors.

- Michael P. Murphy Memorial - at Penn State University, the class of 2011's senior gift.
- Michael P. Murphy Memorial Park - located in Murphy's hometown
- Lieutenant Michael P. Murphy United States Post Office - On 7 May 2007, the Lieutenant Michael P. Murphy United States Post Office was dedicated in Patchogue, New York.
- USS Michael Murphy (DDG-112) - On 7 May 2008, Secretary of the Navy Donald C. Winter announced that DDG-112, the last planned U.S. Navy Arleigh Burke-class destroyer at the time, would be named USS Michael Murphy (DDG-112) in honor of Murphy. On 7 May 2011, on what would have been Murphy's 35th birthday, USS Michael Murphy was christened by his mother Maureen Murphy, the ship's sponsor.
- Lt. Michael P. Murphy Combat Training Pool - On 9 July 2009, the newly constructed Combat Training Pool at the Naval Station Newport, Rhode Island, was dedicated in honor of Murphy.

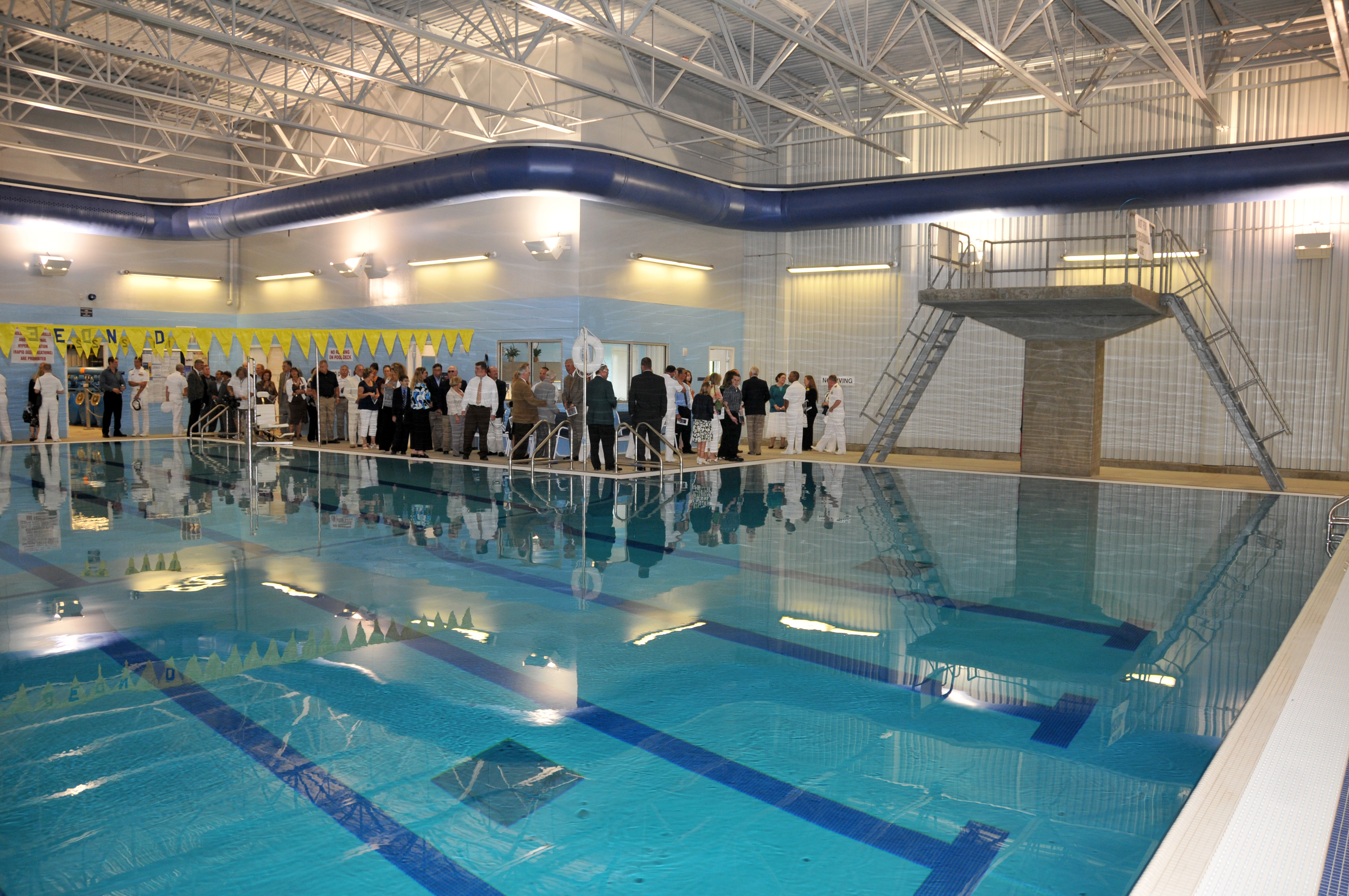
Guests tour the new Lt. Michael Murphy Combat Training Pool during a dedication ceremony at Officer Training Command, Newport. The pool will be used by officer candidates and students at Officer Training Command Newport for swim qualifications.

- LT Michael P. Murphy Navy SEAL Museum - The LT Michael P. Murphy Navy SEAL Museum/Sea Cadet Training Facility is a dual purpose building located in West Sayville, New York, with a museum dedicated to telling the history, legacy and sacrifices of Naval Special Warfare operators from World War II and the underwater demolition teams through the present day, the war on terror with seven exhibition halls, a theater, and SEAL Adventure Ride. The building also houses a Sea Cadet Training Facility which is the home of the LT Michael P. Murphy Sea Cadet Division of the United States Naval Sea Cadet Corps.

=== Murph workout ===
Murphy created his own CrossFit-style workout called "Body Armor", which involved running, pushing, pulling, and lifting exercises while wearing body armor, a 16.4 lb (7.4 kg) vest that he wore while deployed. After Murphy's death, on August 17, 2005, the founder of CrossFit Greg Glassman posted the workout to CrossFit's website as the Workout of the Day (WOD). The regimen of a one mile run, 100 pull-ups, 200 push-ups, 300 air squats and another mile run, while wearing the body armor vest, is named the "Murph Challenge" in his honor. The Body Armor workout became popular among SEAL teams everywhere as it could be done almost anywhere and required very little equipment. Now the workout is often performed at CrossFit affiliates, military bases, and Navy ships, as well as members of the public, around the world on Memorial Day.

== In media ==
In the 2013 film Lone Survivor, Murphy is portrayed by actor Taylor Kitsch.

Murph: The Protector is a 2013 documentary about Murphy as told by his family and friends.

== See also ==
- List of post-Vietnam War Medal of Honor recipients
- List of United States Navy SEALs
