= Agler =

Agler is a surname. Notable people with the surname include:

- Bob Agler (1924–2005), American football player
- Brian Agler (born 1958), American basketball player and coach
- Jesse Agler, American sportscaster
- Jim Agler, American mathematician
- Joe Agler (1887–1971), American baseball player
- Vickie Agler, American politician from Missouri
- Walter G. Agler (1880–1944), American politician from Ohio

== Other uses ==
- Agler-La Follette House

== See also ==
- Alger (name)
