= Spencer Swalm =

American politician

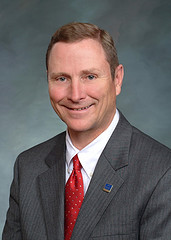

Member of the Colorado House of Representatives from the 37th district
- In office January 10, 2007 – January 7, 2015
- Preceded by: Lauri Clapp
- Succeeded by: Jack Tate

Personal details
- Party: Republican
- Spouse: Marleen
- Profession: Insurance broker
- Website: http://www.spencerswalm.com/

Spencer Swalm is a former legislator in Colorado. First elected to the Colorado House of Representatives as a Republican in 2006, Swalm represented House District 37, which encompasses most of the city of Centennial, Colorado. Term limited, he did not run for re-election in 2014, so his term ended in January 2015.

== Early career ==
Born in Colorado, Swalm attended Colorado College before transferring to the University of Colorado Boulder, graduating with a bachelor's degree in history in 1975. He then earned a J.D. from the University of Denver in 1979.

After practicing law for over a decade, specializing in estate planning, Swalm entered the employee benefits and health insurance business in 1990 as a partner in Redstone Benefit Systems. He has served as the chair of the legislative committee of the Colorado State Association of Health Underwriters.

In the early 1980s, Swalm began writing op-ed pieces opposing government transportation subsidies and joined the Independence Institute, a Colorado free-market think tank, eventually becoming a senior fellow. He opposed the 2004 tax measure funding the FasTracks light rail expansion. He has also served on the board of the Colorado Council on Economic Education. Politically, Swalm has been a member of the Colorado Republican Business Coalition, the Centennial Republican Forum, the Arapahoe County Republican Men's Club, and was treasurer for the Sixth Congressional District Republican Committee.

Swalm is married; he and his wife, Marleen, have three children: Byron, Lauren, and Jocelyn. Swalm has taught Sunday school and served on the missions committee of his church, Grace Chapel, and has taken several missionary trips to the Amazon Basin in Bolivia.

== Political career ==
=== 2006 election ===
Swalm won election to Colorado's 37th House District in 2006. He faced Centennial Councilwoman Betty Ann Habig in the Republican primary, losing to her at the party assembly, but defeating her in the party primary. He then defeated Democrat Angela Engel with just over 51 percent of the vote.

=== 2007 legislative session ===
In the 2007 session of the Colorado General Assembly, Swalm sat on the House Health and Human Services Committee and the House Transportation and Energy Committee. Swalm's father, Paul Swalm, had served on the Denver, Colorado city council and in the Colorado House of Representatives in the 1970s, and Swalm was assigned the same seat in the house chamber as his father.

That year, Swalm sponsored legislation that would require sex offenders to register their email addresses and other online identities with the state. After being defeated in committee, the bill was resubmitted to apply only to sex offenders whose victims are children, and was signed into law. He plans on submitting legislation to extend the program to all sex offenders in future sessions.

Swalm also sponsored successful legislation designed to encourage Coloradans to purchase long term care insurance rather than relying on Medicaid, allowing Coloradans to participate in a federal long term care partnership program.

Between legislative sessions, Swalm served on the interim Health Care Task Force and on the Transportation Legislation Review Committee.

=== 2008 legislative session ===
For the 2008 legislative session, Swalm plans to sponsor a measure that would create a special pass to offset state park maintenance costs. As part of a set of Republican health care proposals, Swalm will sponsor legislation to create a low-cost state health insurance plan and to encourage tax breaks for individual health insurance. He has also, working with Democratic Rep. Morgan Carroll, introduced legislation to extend a fund to provide financial assistance to military families. The bill was passed by the legislature and signed into the law by Gov. Bill Ritter.

Swalm also introduced legislation to create the "Colorado Health Plan," a low-cost health insurance program to be run by the state, but the proposal was killed in committee. Democratic House Speaker Andrew Romanoff has expressed interest in reviving the bill. Swalm also reintroduced his bill to require sex offenders to register their email addresses, which was again killed in committee.

=== 2008 election ===
Because of the closeness of Swalm's 2006 election in a traditionally Republican district, Democrats targeted Swalm's re-election bid in 2008. Swalm faces Diana Holland, a Democrat and Littleton School Board member, and Constitution Party candidate Brian Olds in the November general election. Swalm's re-election bid was endorsed by the Denver Post. He ultimately won with 51 percent of the popular vote, nearly 2000 votes ahead of Holland.

=== 2009 legislative session ===
For the 2009 legislative session, Swalm was named to seats on the House Finance Committee and the House Health and Human Services Committee. Representative Swalm worked with centrist Democratic Representative Sara Gagliardi to promote a bipartisan measure lowering the age limit for blood donations to 16.

=== 2011 legislative session ===
Representative Swalm returned to the House Committee on Finance. He was also appointed as vice-chair of the newly renamed Economic & Business Development Committee.

=== 2012 election ===
In the 2012 General Election, Representative Swalm faced Democratic challenger Jan Spooner. Swalm was elected by a margin of 53% to 44% with third party candidates garnering the remainder of the vote.
