= Lauri Clapp =

American politician

Lauri Clapp is a former state legislator in Colorado. The Colorado Independent described her as a conservative firebrand. She served in the Colorado House of Representatives from 1999 to 2006. A Republican, she represented Arapahoe County.

She was one of several conservative Republicans in the House along with Vickie Agler, Nancy Spence, Lynn Hefley, Lola Spradley, and Debbie Allen (politician).
