= Centennial, Colorado =

City in Colorado, US

- Home rule city
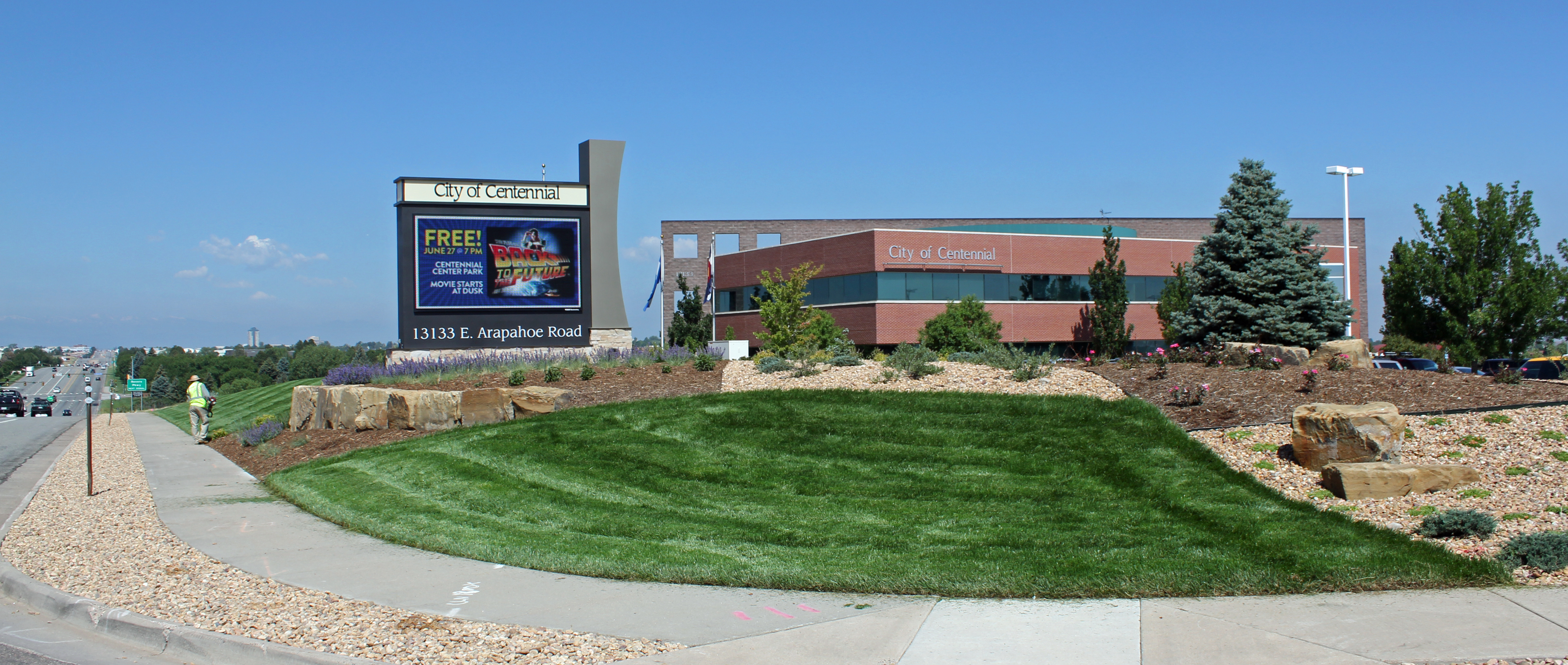
- Centennial Civic Center located on East Arapahoe Road

- Flag
- Motto: Spirit of the Past
- Interactive map of Centennial, Colorado
- Location within Colorado Location within the United States
- Coordinates: 39°36′20″N 104°45′36″W
- Country: United States
- State: Colorado
- County: Arapahoe
- Incorporated: February 7, 2001

Government
  - Type: Home rule city

Area
  - Total: 29.867 sq mi (77.355 km^{2})
  - Land: 29.721 sq mi (76.976 km^{2})
  - Water: 0.146 sq mi (0.379 km^{2})
- Elevation: 5,722 ft (1,744 m)

Population (2020)
  - Total: 108,418
  - Rank: 11th in Colorado
  - Density: 3,648/sq mi (1,409/km^{2})
- Time zone: UTC−07:00 (MST)
  - Summer (DST): UTC−06:00 (MDT)
- ZIP code: 80015-80016, 80111-80112, 80121-80122, 80161 (PO Box)
- Area codes: 303/720/983
- GNIS city ID: 2409422
- FIPS code: 08-12815
- Website: www.centennialco.gov

Centennial is a home rule city in Arapahoe County, Colorado, United States. The city population was 108,418 at the 2020 census, making Centennial the 11th-most populous municipality in Colorado. Centennial is a principal city of the Denver metropolitan area and a part of the Front Range Urban Corridor.

== History ==
The City of Centennial was incorporated on February 7, 2001, from portions of unincorporated Arapahoe County, including the former Castlewood and Southglenn census-designated places (CDPs). The citizens of the area had voted to incorporate on September 12, 2000, choosing Centennial as the official name during the vote. The name reflects Colorado's admission to the Union as the 38th state in 1876, the centennial year of the United States Declaration of Independence. The state of Colorado is nicknamed the "Centennial State".

Incorporation was approved by 77% of the voters, and the population of the area at over 100,000 made it the largest incorporation in U.S. history as of its creation. The city was incorporated in large part to prevent further annexations of unincorporated areas by the city of Greenwood Village in an attempt to improve its tax base. The taxes generated from businesses in unincorporated portions of Arapahoe County funded the majority of the county's services, including road work. A number of court cases eventually established the right of incorporation to take precedence over the right of annexation.

In 2008, Centennial voters approved a referendum by approximately a 2-to-1 margin making Centennial a home rule city.

Centennial Airport, formerly the Arapahoe County Airport, lies adjacent to Centennial, but is located in unincorporated Arapahoe County. The airport is not named after the city, as it predates the city by over 30 years.

== Geography ==
Centennial is roughly divided in half by Interstate 25, with most of its business and entertainment centers lying west of the highway.

Centennial has many hills, gullies and ravines, and its open spaces are usually accompanied by recreational trails and parks, including Dry Creek Dam, DeKoevend Park, the High Line Canal Trail, Willow Creek Trail, as well as Big Dry Creek and Little Dry Creek Trails. Centennial hosts most native wildlife and is a good reflection of Colorado's front range ecosystem. Centennial has seen a boost in coyote populations in recent years, leading to resident education on how to deter coyotes from eating family pets.

At the 2020 United States census, the city had a total area of 19,115 acres (77.355 km^{2}) including 94 acres (0.379 km^{2}) of water.

== Demographics ==
Historical population
Census	Pop.	Note	%±
1980	54,200		—
1990	67,479		24.5%
2000	69,087		2.4%
2010	100,377		45.3%
2020	108,418		8.0%
2024 (est.)	108,853	▲	0.4%
U.S. Decennial Census

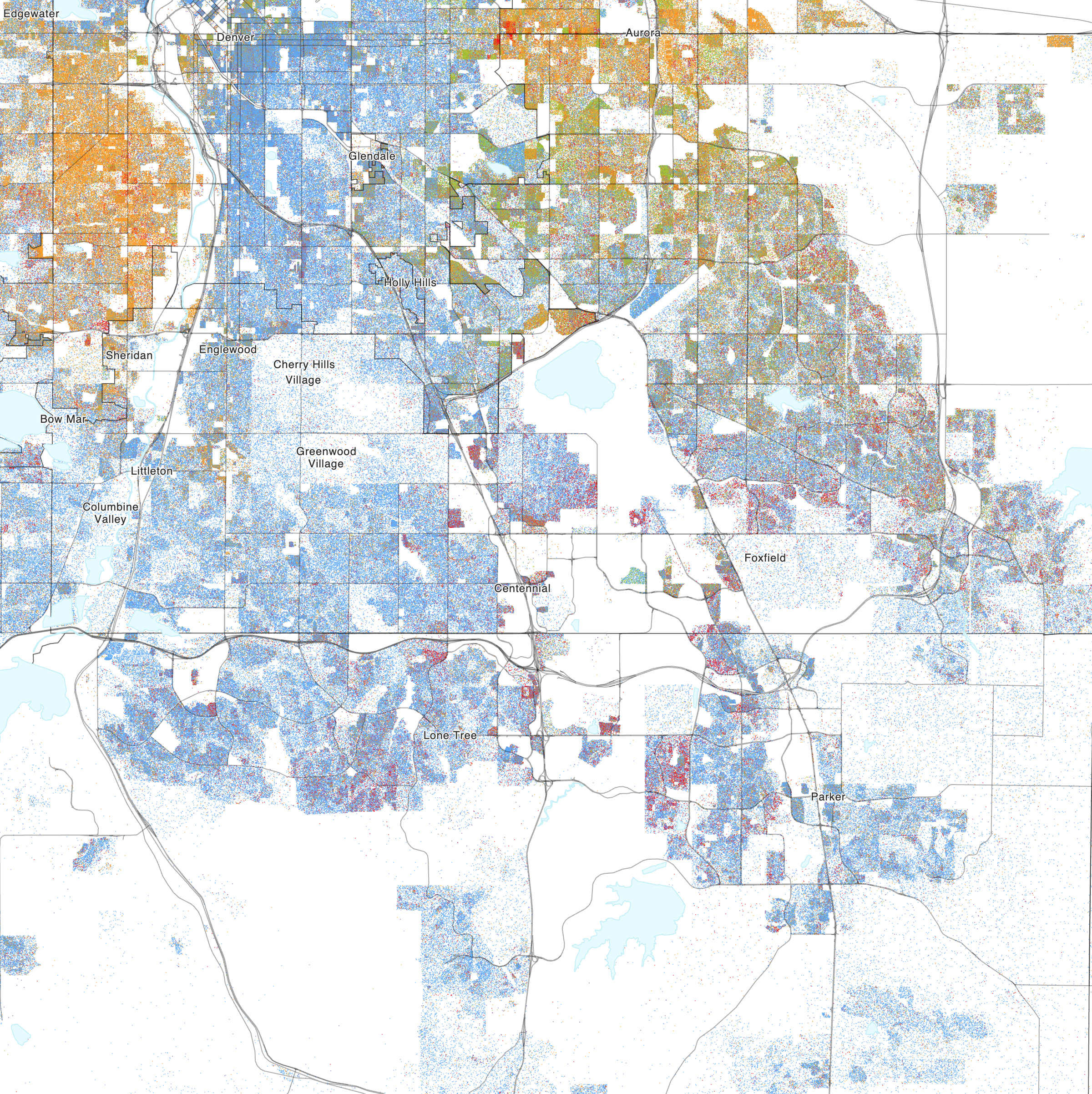
Map of racial distribution in Centennial, 2020 U.S. census. Each dot is one person: ⬤ White ⬤ Black ⬤ Asian ⬤ Hispanic ⬤ Multiracial ⬤ Native American/Other

Centennial, Colorado – Racial and ethnic composition Note: the US Census treats Hispanic/Latino as an ethnic category. This table excludes Latinos from the racial categories and assigns them to a separate category. Hispanics/Latinos may be of any race.
Race / Ethnicity (NH = Non-Hispanic)	Pop 2010	Pop 2020	% 2010	% 2020
White alone (NH)	82,664	81,391	82.35%	75.07%
Black or African American alone (NH)	3,146	3,545	3.13%	3.27%
Native American or Alaska Native alone (NH)	284	266	0.28%	0.25%
Asian alone (NH)	4,340	6,794	4.32%	6.27%
Pacific Islander alone (NH)	94	109	0.09%	0.10%
Some Other Race alone (NH)	131	508	0.13%	0.47%
Mixed Race or Multi-Racial (NH)	2,261	5,387	2.25%	4.97%
Hispanic or Latino (any race)	7,457	10,418	7.43%	9.61%
Total	100,377	108,418	100.00%	100.00%

The city is approximately composed of 87.4% White, 4.8% Hispanic or Latino, 3.6% Asian, 2.4% African American, 0.4% Native American, and 0.3% from other races.

The median age is 37.2 years, in comparison to the 35.3-year national average. For every 100 females, there are 98 males.

== Economy ==
National CineMedia, Emergenetics International and United Launch Alliance are among the companies based in Centennial. According to Centennial's 2023 Annual Comprehensive Financial Report, the top employers in the city are:

#	Employer
1	Comcast
2	United Healthcare
3	Arrow Electronics
4	United Launch Alliance
5	CommonSpirit Health
6	Sierra Nevada Corporation
7	The Travelers Indemnity Company
8	Ring Central
9	Standard & Poor's
10	MasTec Advanced Technologies

== Schools ==
Most of Centennial is within the territory of the Cherry Creek Public Schools while the western portion of the city in the territory of Littleton Public Schools. Centennial is also served by a few private schools.

Private Elementary and Middle Schools

- St. Thomas More Parish School
- Highlands Baptist Academy
- Shepherd of the Hills Christian School
- Centennial Christian Academy
- C.A.R.E. Middle School

Seminary

- Gateway Seminary

== Government ==
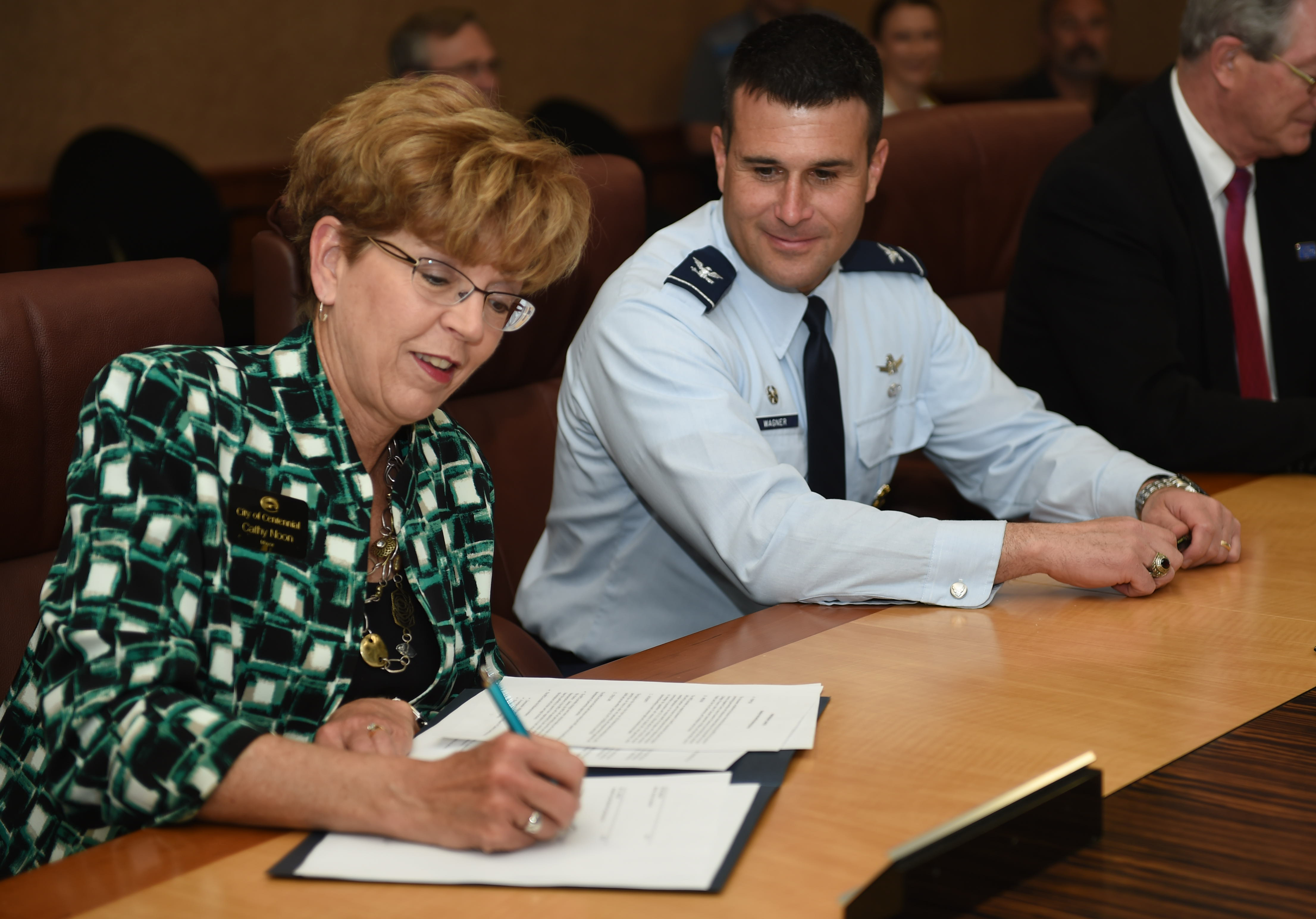
Cathy Noon, mayor at the time, signs the Buckley Air Force Base Partnership Steering Group charter on March 31, 2015.

The city is governed under the council–manager form of government which limits the power of the city to levy and collect taxes. The city council has eight members. The Mayor and Council Members are all part-time officials who hold other full-time jobs. As of 2026, the mayor is Christine Sweetland and the city manager is Matt Sturgeon.

== Sports ==
Dove Valley, an unincorporated area bordering Centennial, is home to the training facilities and team headquarters for the Denver Broncos, a National Football League franchise that plays in Denver. The team moved their headquarters to Dove Valley in 1990 and built their training facilities there in 2003. The Pat Bowlen Fieldhouse was constructed on the campus in 2014 and houses 115,000 square feet (10,700 m^{2}) of training space and offices. A major expansion of the team's facilities was announced in 2023 and is planned to be completed in 2023.

Denver Summit FC in the National Women's Soccer League plans to build their training center in Centennial in a partnership with the city government and the Cherry Creek School District. The center will include eight fields on 43 acres (17 ha) of land and an indoor training area. A temporary 12,000-seat stadium on the grounds is planned to open in 2026 for the team's inaugural season and be used for two seasons while construction of a permanent stadium in Denver is completed. The Centennial stadium project is expected to cost up to $25 million with funding from the team and school district. After the 2027 season, the stadium's capacity is planned to be reduced to 4,000 seats and continue to be used by the school district.

== Points of interest ==
- International Headquarters for Gamma Phi Beta sorority are located in Centennial. Gamma Phi Beta was the first women's organization to use the term "sorority".
- Centennial was chosen in 2008 as the site of the first IKEA store in Colorado. The IKEA Centennial location opened on July 27, 2011. It is the second-largest IKEA store in the United States. IKEA Centennial was awarded the Project of the Year in 2011 by city of Centennial.
- Centennial is home to the headquarters of the National Cattlemen's Beef Association (NCBA). NCBA also maintains an office in Washington, D.C.
- Centennial is home to the headquarters of Arrow Electronics and is the largest company headquartered in Colorado.

== People ==
Notable individuals who were born in or have lived in Centennial include:

- Amy Barczuk (born 1990), soccer defender, midfielder
- Madisen Beaty (born 1995), actress
- Melissa Benoist (born 1988), actress
- Tory Bruno (born 1961), aerospace engineer
- Tom Costello (born 1963), journalist
- Kevin Gausman (born 1991), baseball pitcher
- Kenny McKinley (1987–2010), football wide receiver
- George Ratterman (1926–2007), football quarterback
- Ryan Sailor (born 1998), soccer defender
- Spencer Swalm (born 1951), Colorado state legislator
- Jack Tate (born 1961), Colorado state legislator
- Ken Tribbett (born 1992), soccer defender, midfielder
- Sean Tufts (born 1982), football linebacker

== See also ==
- Front Range Urban Corridor
