= List of Colorado municipalities by population =

Coordinates: 38.9972°N 105.5478°W

A map of the United States with the state of Colorado highlighted

Colorado is the 20th-most populous state and 8th-most extensive state, spanning 103,637.314 square miles (268,419.41 km^{2}) of land. Colorado is divided into 64 counties and has 272 active municipalities, comprising 197 towns, 73 cities, and two consolidated city and county governments. (Note: 1. At the 2000 United States Census, the State of Colorado had 269 active municipalities, comprising 196 towns, 72 cities, and one consolidated city and county government.; 2. On February 7, 2001, the City of Centennial was incorporated.; 3. On November 15, 2001, the City of Broomfield became the City and County of Broomfield, increasing the number of Colorado counties to 64.; 4. On June 30, 2004, the Town of Watkins was incorporated, but on November 30, 2006, the Town of Watkins was dissolved.; 5. On November 6, 2007, the City of Castle Pines North was incorporated.; 6. Thus, at the 2010 United States Census, the State of Colorado had 271 active municipalities, comprising 196 towns, 73 cities, and two consolidated city and county governments.; 7. On November 2, 2010, the City of Castle Pines North changed its name to the City of Castle Pines.; 8. On November 4, 2014, the property owners of Carbonate, Colorado, voted to reactivate the Town of Carbonate.; 9. Thus, at the 2020 United States Census, the State of Colorado had 272 active municipalities, comprising 197 towns, 73 cities, and two consolidated city and county governments.; 10. On April 3, 2023, the Town of Keystone was incorporated.; 11. On November 7, 2023, voters approved a Home Rule Charter for the Town of Erie.; 12. On July 28, 2026, the Town of Hartman was declared abandoned.; 13. Thus, the State of Colorado continues to have 272 active municipalities, comprising 197 towns, 73 cities, and two consolidated city and county governments.)

This list ranks the 272 active incorporated municipalities of the U.S. State of Colorado by population as of July 1, 2025, as estimated by the United States Census Bureau. This list also details municipal population changes since the 2000 census and includes a gallery of the 20 most populous Colorado municipalities. With a 2025 population estimate of 740,613 residents, the City and County of Denver remains the most populous municipality in Colorado as it has since its original incorporation on December 3, 1859. (Note: United States Census Bureau estimates of municipal population as of July 1, 2025.) The Town of Carbonate remains with no year-round residents as it has since the 1890 census. Colorado now has 13 cities with more than 100,000 residents, and 17 towns with fewer than 100 residents.

== Municipalities ==
Select the OpenStreetMap link at the right to view the location of these 272 municipalities.
For municipal maps, see the Colorado municipal boundaries map.

†	County seat
‡	State capital

The 272 active municipalities of the U.S. State of Colorado ranked by population
Municipality	Population							
Municipality	2025 rank	2025 estimate	Change	2020 Census	Change	2010 Census	Change	2000 Census
Denver ‡ (Note: The City and County of Denver is the capital of the State of Colorado.) (Note: As a consolidated city and county, the City and County of Denver is its own county seat.) (Note: The City and County of Denver is the 19th most populous U.S. municipality.) (Note: The City and County of Denver is the principal city of the Denver-Aurora-Centennial, CO Metropolitan Statistical Area and the Denver-Aurora-Greeley, CO Combined Statistical Area.) (Note: Denver has retained its “Mile-High City” elevation of 5,280 feet (1,609.344 m) despite advances in scientific measurement. When the National Geodetic Survey makes adjustments to the North American Vertical Datum (NAVD), the State of Colorado moves the official mile-high elevation point up or down the west steps of the Colorado State Capitol to reflect the changes. Most of Denver actually lies above this elevation.)	1	740,613	+3.51%	715,522	+19.22%	600,158	+8.21%	554,636
Colorado Springs† (Note: The City of Colorado Springs is the 40th most populous U.S. municipality.) (Note: The City of Colorado Springs is the principal city of the Colorado Springs, CO Metropolitan Statistical Area and the seat of El Paso County, Colorado.)	2	494,743	+3.30%	478,961	+15.02%	416,427	+15.39%	360,890
Aurora (Note: The City of Aurora is the 51st most populous U.S. municipality.) (Note: The City of Aurora is a principal city of the Denver-Aurora-Centennial, CO Metropolitan Statistical Area and the Denver-Aurora-Greeley, CO Combined Statistical Area.)	3	410,053	+6.16%	386,261	+18.82%	325,078	+17.61%	276,393
Fort Collins† (Note: The City of Fort Collins is the principal city of the Fort Collins, CO Metropolitan Statistical Area and the seat of Larimer County, Colorado.)	4	171,500	+1.00%	169,810	+17.94%	143,986	+21.35%	118,652
Lakewood	5	156,927	+0.60%	155,984	+9.09%	142,980	−0.80%	144,126
Thornton	6	147,766	+4.16%	141,867	+19.44%	118,772	+44.17%	82,384
Arvada	7	122,901	−1.21%	124,402	+16.88%	106,433	+4.19%	102,153
Westminster	8	116,182	−0.12%	116,317	+9.62%	106,114	+5.13%	100,940
Greeley† (Note: The City of Greeley is the principal city of the Greeley, CO Metropolitan Statistical Area and the seat of Weld County, Colorado.)	9	115,073	+5.77%	108,795	+17.12%	92,889	+20.74%	76,930
Pueblo† (Note: The City of Pueblo is the principal city of the Pueblo, CO Metropolitan Statistical Area and the Pueblo-Cañon City, CO Combined Statistical Area and the seat of Pueblo County, Colorado.)	10	110,404	−1.32%	111,876	+4.95%	106,595	+4.38%	102,121
Centennial (Note: The City of Centennial is a principal city of the Denver-Aurora-Centennial, CO Metropolitan Statistical Area.)	11	108,658	+0.22%	108,418	+8.01%	100,377	NA	NA
Boulder† (Note: The City of Boulder is the principal city of the Boulder, CO Metropolitan Statistical Area and the seat of Boulder County, Colorado.)	12	105,689	−2.37%	108,250	+11.16%	97,385	+2.86%	94,673
Longmont	13	100,109	+1.24%	98,885	+14.62%	86,270	+21.35%	71,093
Castle Rock† (Note: The Town of Castle Rock is the seat of Douglas County, Colorado.)	14	83,815	+14.57%	73,158	+51.68%	48,231	+138.48%	20,224
Loveland	15	81,387	+6.56%	76,378	+14.24%	66,859	+32.11%	50,608
Broomfield† (Note: As a consolidated city and county, the City and County of Broomfield is its own county seat.)	16	79,174	+6.83%	74,112	+32.61%	55,889	+46.03%	38,272
Commerce City	17	72,345	+15.90%	62,418	+35.95%	45,913	+118.73%	20,991
Grand Junction† (Note: The City of Grand Junction is the principal city of the Grand Junction, CO Metropolitan Statistical Area and the seat of Mesa County, Colorado.)	18	71,827	+9.56%	65,560	+11.94%	58,566	+39.49%	41,986
Parker	19	65,985	+12.77%	58,512	+29.17%	45,297	+92.28%	23,558
Littleton† (Note: The City of Littleton is the seat of Arapahoe County, Colorado.)	20	46,246	+1.30%	45,652	+9.38%	41,737	+3.46%	40,340
Brighton† (Note: The City of Brighton is the seat of Adams County, Colorado.)	21	45,395	+13.25%	40,083	+20.18%	33,352	+59.54%	20,905
Windsor	22	43,840	+34.00%	32,716	+75.48%	18,644	+88.40%	9,896
Erie	23	40,904	+36.17%	30,038	+65.64%	18,135	+188.27%	6,291
Northglenn	24	38,893	+2.00%	38,131	+6.54%	35,789	+13.35%	31,575
Englewood	25	35,305	+4.89%	33,659	+11.25%	30,255	−4.64%	31,727
Wheat Ridge	26	32,081	−0.98%	32,398	+7.40%	30,166	−8.35%	32,913
Lafayette	27	30,116	−0.97%	30,411	+24.37%	24,453	+5.41%	23,197
Fountain	28	29,450	−1.18%	29,802	+15.31%	25,846	+70.07%	15,197
Evans	29	22,500	+1.51%	22,165	+19.57%	18,537	+94.84%	9,514
Johnstown	30	22,433	+29.65%	17,303	+75.01%	9,887	+158.35%	3,827
Montrose† (Note: The City of Montrose is the principal city of the Montrose, CO Micropolitan Statistical Area and the seat of Montrose County, Colorado.)	31	21,583	+6.37%	20,291	+6.06%	19,132	+54.99%	12,344
Louisville	32	20,581	−3.04%	21,226	+15.51%	18,376	−2.96%	18,937
Golden† (Note: The City of Golden is the seat of Jefferson County, Colorado.)	33	20,390	−0.04%	20,399	+8.12%	18,867	+9.95%	17,159
Firestone	34	20,129	+22.88%	16,381	+61.44%	10,147	+431.81%	1,908
Durango† (Note: The City of Durango is the principal city of the Durango, CO Micropolitan Statistical Area and the seat of La Plata County, Colorado.)	35	19,733	+3.47%	19,071	+12.93%	16,887	+21.30%	13,922
Frederick	36	18,241	+25.69%	14,513	+67.22%	8,679	+251.80%	2,467
Cañon City† (Note: The City of Cañon City is a principal city of the Cañon City, CO Micropolitan Statistical Area and the Pueblo-Cañon City, CO Combined Statistical Area. and the seat of Fremont County, Colorado.)	37	17,030	−0.65%	17,141	+4.52%	16,400	+6.28%	15,431
Castle Pines	38	15,583	+41.20%	11,036	NA	NA	NA	NA
Greenwood Village	39	15,323	−2.35%	15,691	+12.68%	13,925	+26.19%	11,035
Lone Tree	40	15,278	+7.19%	14,253	+39.49%	10,218	+109.69%	4,873
Berthoud	41	14,080	+36.28%	10,332	+102.39%	5,105	+5.50%	4,839
Federal Heights	42	14,075	−2.13%	14,382	+25.42%	11,467	−4.96%	12,065
Fruita	43	14,003	+4.54%	13,395	+5.92%	12,646	+95.21%	6,478
Monument	44	13,813	+32.83%	10,399	+88.05%	5,530	+180.57%	1,971
Superior	45	13,637	+4.15%	13,094	+4.89%	12,483	+38.53%	9,011
Steamboat Springs† (Note: The City of Steamboat Springs is the principal city of the Steamboat Springs, CO Micropolitan Statistical Area and the Steamboat Springs-Craig, CO Combined Statistical Area and the seat of Routt County, Colorado.)	46	13,557	+2.52%	13,224	+9.40%	12,088	+23.16%	9,815
Sterling† (Note: The City of Sterling is the principal city of the Sterling, CO Micropolitan Statistical Area and the seat of Logan County, Colorado.)	47	13,054	−4.96%	13,735	−7.05%	14,777	+30.08%	11,360
Wellington	48	12,169	+10.16%	11,047	+75.66%	6,289	+135.37%	2,672
Fort Morgan† (Note: The City of Fort Morgan is the principal city of the Fort Morgan, CO Micropolitan Statistical Area and the seat of Morgan County, Colorado.)	49	11,841	+2.10%	11,597	+2.49%	11,315	+2.55%	11,034
Severance	50	11,841	+54.12%	7,683	+142.75%	3,165	+430.15%	597
Timnath	51	11,600	+78.82%	6,487	+937.92%	625	+180.27%	223
Rifle	52	10,844	+3.90%	10,437	+13.79%	9,172	+35.20%	6,784
Fort Lupton	53	10,402	+30.76%	7,955	+7.84%	7,377	+8.69%	6,787
Glenwood Springs† (Note: The City of Glenwood Springs is a principal city of the Glenwood Springs, CO Micropolitan Statistical Area and the Edwards-Glenwood Springs, CO Combined Statistical Area and the seat of Garfield County, Colorado.)	54	10,395	+4.34%	9,963	+3.63%	9,614	+24.28%	7,736
Alamosa† (Note: The Town of Alamosa is the seat of Alamosa County, Colorado.)	55	9,849	+0.44%	9,806	+11.69%	8,780	+10.30%	7,960
Delta† (Note: The City of Delta is the seat of Delta County, Colorado.)	56	9,802	+8.49%	9,035	+1.35%	8,915	+39.30%	6,400
Gypsum	57	9,212	+14.58%	8,040	+24.13%	6,477	+77.26%	3,654
Milliken	58	9,183	+9.50%	8,386	+49.48%	5,610	+94.25%	2,888
Cortez† (Note: The City of Cortez is the seat of Montezuma County, Colorado.)	59	9,126	+4.11%	8,766	+3.35%	8,482	+6.33%	7,977
Craig† (Note: The City of Craig is a principal city of the Craig, CO Micropolitan Statistical Area and the Steamboat Springs-Craig, CO Combined Statistical Area and the seat of Moffat County, Colorado.)	60	8,874	−2.05%	9,060	−4.27%	9,464	+2.99%	9,189
Lochbuie	61	8,776	+8.51%	8,088	+71.14%	4,726	+130.65%	2,049
Trinidad† (Note: The City of Trinidad is the seat of Las Animas County, Colorado.)	62	8,091	−2.86%	8,329	−8.43%	9,096	+0.20%	9,078
Woodland Park	63	8,014	+1.19%	7,920	+10.00%	7,200	+10.51%	6,515
Lamar† (Note: The City of Lamar is the seat of Prowers County, Colorado.)	64	7,588	−1.29%	7,687	−1.50%	7,804	−12.01%	8,869
Eagle† (Note: The Town of Eagle is the seat of Eagle County, Colorado.)	65	7,280	−3.08%	7,511	+15.41%	6,508	+114.64%	3,032
Mead	66	7,042	+47.29%	4,781	+40.41%	3,405	+68.82%	2,017
La Junta† (Note: The City of La Junta is the seat of Otero County, Colorado.)	67	6,864	−6.26%	7,322	+3.46%	7,077	−6.49%	7,568
Dacono	68	6,844	+8.69%	6,297	+51.66%	4,152	+37.71%	3,015
Gunnison† (Note: The City of Gunnison is the seat of Gunnison County, Colorado.)	69	6,836	+4.21%	6,560	+12.06%	5,854	+8.23%	5,409
Carbondale	70	6,762	+5.10%	6,434	+0.11%	6,427	+23.69%	5,196
Aspen† (Note: The City of Aspen is the seat of Pitkin County, Colorado.)	71	6,489	−7.35%	7,004	+5.20%	6,658	+12.58%	5,914
Cherry Hills Village	72	6,389	−0.82%	6,442	+7.60%	5,987	+0.49%	5,958
Avon	73	6,184	+1.84%	6,072	−5.82%	6,447	+15.93%	5,561
Salida† (Note: The City of Salida is the seat of Chaffee County, Colorado.)	74	5,985	+5.63%	5,666	+8.21%	5,236	−4.87%	5,504
Sheridan	75	5,972	−2.18%	6,105	+7.79%	5,664	+1.14%	5,600
Eaton	76	5,848	+0.79%	5,802	+32.92%	4,365	+62.27%	2,690
Estes Park	77	5,780	−2.10%	5,904	+0.79%	5,858	+8.22%	5,413
Silverthorne	78	5,418	+23.08%	4,402	+13.25%	3,887	+21.62%	3,196
Brush	79	5,337	−0.04%	5,339	−2.27%	5,463	+6.76%	5,117
Breckenridge† (Note: The Town of Breckenridge is the principal city of the Breckenridge, CO Micropolitan Statistical Area. and the seat of Summit County, Colorado.)	80	5,015	−1.24%	5,078	+11.85%	4,540	+88.54%	2,408
New Castle	81	4,896	−0.55%	4,923	+8.96%	4,518	+127.72%	1,984
Edgewater	82	4,870	−2.70%	5,005	−3.19%	5,170	−5.05%	5,445
Manitou Springs	83	4,577	−5.78%	4,858	−2.68%	4,992	+0.24%	4,980
Glendale	84	4,475	−2.99%	4,613	+10.25%	4,184	−7.98%	4,547
Vail	85	4,407	−8.85%	4,835	−8.86%	5,305	+17.08%	4,531
Bennett	86	4,224	+47.59%	2,862	+24.00%	2,308	+14.20%	2,021
Basalt	87	4,009	+0.63%	3,984	+3.29%	3,857	+43.86%	2,681
Monte Vista	88	4,005	−5.70%	4,247	−4.43%	4,444	−1.88%	4,529
Florence	89	3,856	+0.89%	3,822	−1.52%	3,881	+6.24%	3,653
Rocky Ford	90	3,752	−3.20%	3,876	−2.05%	3,957	−7.68%	4,286
Silt	91	3,743	+5.85%	3,536	+20.68%	2,930	+68.39%	1,740
Yuma	92	3,424	−0.93%	3,456	−1.93%	3,524	+7.28%	3,285
Orchard City	93	3,299	+5.00%	3,142	+0.74%	3,119	+8.30%	2,880
Buena Vista	94	3,248	+13.77%	2,855	+9.09%	2,617	+19.23%	2,195
Burlington† (Note: The City of Burlington is the seat of Kit Carson County, Colorado.)	95	3,164	−0.25%	3,172	−25.43%	4,254	+15.66%	3,678
Walsenburg† (Note: The City of Walsenburg is the seat of Huerfano County, Colorado.)	96	3,039	−0.33%	3,049	−0.62%	3,068	−26.64%	4,182
Bayfield	97	2,974	+4.79%	2,838	+21.65%	2,333	+50.61%	1,549
Snowmass Village	98	2,965	−4.23%	3,096	+9.55%	2,826	+55.10%	1,822
Elizabeth	99	2,957	+76.54%	1,675	+23.34%	1,358	−5.30%	1,434
Platteville	100	2,908	−1.59%	2,955	+18.91%	2,485	+4.85%	2,370
Frisco	101	2,792	−4.15%	2,913	+8.57%	2,683	+9.82%	2,443
Leadville† (Note: The City of Leadville is the seat of Lake County, Colorado.)	102	2,668	+1.33%	2,633	+1.19%	2,602	−7.76%	2,821
Ault	103	2,667	+41.34%	1,887	+24.23%	1,519	+6.08%	1,432
Palisade	104	2,599	+1.33%	2,565	−4.72%	2,692	+4.38%	2,579
Palmer Lake	105	2,591	−1.71%	2,636	+8.93%	2,420	+11.06%	2,179
Telluride† (Note: The Town of Telluride is the seat of San Miguel County, Colorado.)	106	2,454	−5.87%	2,607	+12.13%	2,325	+4.68%	2,221
Cedaredge	107	2,448	+7.42%	2,279	+1.15%	2,253	+21.52%	1,854
Meeker† (Note: The Town of Meeker is the seat of Rio Blanco County, Colorado.)	108	2,417	+1.81%	2,374	−4.08%	2,475	+10.39%	2,242
Granby	109	2,392	+15.06%	2,079	+11.53%	1,864	+22.23%	1,525
Wray† (Note: The City of Wray is the seat of Yuma County, Colorado.)	110	2,352	−0.25%	2,358	+0.68%	2,342	+7.09%	2,187
Las Animas† (Note: The City of Las Animas is the seat of Bent County, Colorado.)	111	2,325	+1.09%	2,300	−4.56%	2,410	−12.62%	2,758
LaSalle	112	2,304	−2.33%	2,359	+20.66%	1,955	+5.73%	1,849
Rangely	113	2,304	+0.22%	2,299	−2.79%	2,365	+12.83%	2,096
Holyoke† (Note: The City of Holyoke is the seat of Phillips County, Colorado.)	114	2,264	−3.50%	2,346	+1.43%	2,313	+2.30%	2,261
Hayden	115	2,250	+15.92%	1,941	+7.24%	1,810	+10.77%	1,634
Lyons	116	2,119	−4.07%	2,209	+8.66%	2,033	+28.26%	1,585
Keenesburg	117	2,107	+68.56%	1,250	+10.91%	1,127	+31.81%	855
Limon	118	2,021	−1.08%	2,043	+8.67%	1,880	−9.22%	2,071
Olathe	119	1,927	−4.56%	2,019	+9.19%	1,849	+17.55%	1,573
Center	120	1,890	−2.02%	1,929	−13.50%	2,230	−6.77%	2,392
Wiggins	121	1,868	+33.33%	1,401	+56.89%	893	+6.56%	838
Idaho Springs	122	1,842	+3.37%	1,782	+3.79%	1,717	−9.11%	1,889
Pagosa Springs† (Note: The Town of Pagosa Springs is the seat of Archuleta County, Colorado.)	123	1,838	+17.00%	1,571	−9.03%	1,727	+8.55%	1,591
Deer Trail	124	1,755	+64.33%	1,068	+95.60%	546	−8.70%	598
Akron† (Note: The Town of Akron is the seat of Washington County, Colorado.)	125	1,725	−1.82%	1,757	+3.23%	1,702	−0.53%	1,711
Crested Butte	126	1,693	+3.29%	1,639	+10.22%	1,487	−2.75%	1,529
Columbine Valley	127	1,684	+12.12%	1,502	+19.59%	1,256	+10.95%	1,132
Hudson	128	1,621	−1.82%	1,651	−29.92%	2,356	+50.54%	1,565
Fraser	129	1,543	+10.21%	1,400	+14.38%	1,224	+34.51%	910
Kersey	130	1,500	+0.33%	1,495	+2.82%	1,454	+4.68%	1,389
Paonia	131	1,477	+2.07%	1,447	−0.28%	1,451	−3.07%	1,497
Nederland	132	1,463	−0.54%	1,471	+1.80%	1,445	+3.66%	1,394
Kremmling	133	1,451	−3.84%	1,509	+4.50%	1,444	−8.49%	1,578
Del Norte† (Note: The Town of Del Norte is the seat of Rio Grande County, Colorado.)	134	1,396	−4.25%	1,458	−13.52%	1,686	−1.11%	1,705
Poncha Springs	135	1,393	+50.59%	925	+25.51%	737	+58.15%	466
Parachute	136	1,366	−1.73%	1,390	+28.11%	1,085	+7.85%	1,006
Ridgway	137	1,324	+11.92%	1,183	+28.03%	924	+29.59%	713
Springfield† (Note: The Town of Springfield is the seat of Baca County, Colorado.)	138	1,293	−2.42%	1,325	−8.68%	1,451	−7.11%	1,562
Keystone (Note: On March 28, 2024, the residents of Keystone, Colorado voted 291 to 140 to incorporate as a Colorado home rule city.) (Note: Keystone population prior to incorporation on April 3, 2023, is for the Keystone CDP.)	139	1,274	−6.94%	1,369	+26.88%	1,079	+30.79%	825
Mancos	140	1,266	+5.85%	1,196	−10.48%	1,336	+19.39%	1,119
Mountain Village	141	1,234	−2.37%	1,264	−4.24%	1,320	+34.97%	978
Georgetown† (Note: The Town of Georgetown is the seat of Clear Creek County, Colorado.)	142	1,217	+8.86%	1,118	+8.12%	1,034	−4.96%	1,088
Julesburg† (Note: The Town of Julesburg is the seat of Sedgwick County, Colorado.)	143	1,217	−6.89%	1,307	+6.69%	1,225	−16.50%	1,467
Winter Park	144	1,217	+17.81%	1,033	+3.40%	999	+50.91%	662
Fowler	145	1,171	−6.54%	1,253	+6.01%	1,182	−1.99%	1,206
Cripple Creek† (Note: The City of Cripple Creek is the seat of Teller County, Colorado.)	146	1,120	−3.03%	1,155	−2.86%	1,189	+6.64%	1,115
Pierce	147	1,086	−1.00%	1,097	+31.53%	834	−5.66%	884
Ordway† (Note: The Town of Ordway is the seat of Crowley County, Colorado.)	148	1,053	−1.22%	1,066	−1.30%	1,080	−13.46%	1,248
Dillon	149	1,029	−3.29%	1,064	+17.70%	904	+12.72%	802
Gilcrest	150	1,017	−1.17%	1,029	−0.48%	1,034	−11.02%	1,162
Minturn	151	986	−4.55%	1,033	+0.58%	1,027	−3.84%	1,068
Mount Crested Butte	152	966	+2.66%	941	+17.48%	801	+13.30%	707
Manassa	153	958	+1.16%	947	−4.44%	991	−4.89%	1,042
Haxtun	154	951	−3.06%	981	+3.70%	946	−3.67%	982
Hotchkiss	155	945	+8.00%	875	−7.31%	944	−2.48%	968
Log Lane Village	156	937	+2.63%	913	+4.58%	873	−13.22%	1,006
Dolores	157	933	+5.42%	885	−5.45%	936	+9.22%	857
Ouray† (Note: The City of Ouray is the seat of Ouray County, Colorado.)	158	929	+3.45%	898	−10.20%	1,000	+23.00%	813
Sanford	159	897	+2.05%	879	0.00%	879	+7.59%	817
Ignacio (Note: The Town of Ignacio is the headquarters of the Southern Ute Indian Tribe.)	160	869	+2.00%	852	+22.24%	697	+4.19%	669
Blue River	161	859	−2.05%	877	+3.30%	849	+23.94%	685
La Veta	162	859	−0.35%	862	+7.75%	800	−13.42%	924
Holly	163	836	−0.12%	837	+4.36%	802	−23.47%	1,048
Oak Creek	164	834	−6.19%	889	+0.57%	884	+4.12%	849
Bow Mar	165	832	−2.46%	853	−1.50%	866	+2.24%	847
Central City (Note: The City of Central is the seat of Gilpin County, Colorado.)	166	807	+3.59%	779	+17.50%	663	+28.74%	515
Williamsburg	167	789	+7.93%	731	+10.42%	662	−7.28%	714
Hugo† (Note: The Town of Hugo is the seat of Lincoln County, Colorado.)	168	781	−0.76%	787	+7.81%	730	−17.51%	885
Foxfield	169	746	−1.06%	754	+10.07%	685	−8.18%	746
Fairplay† (Note: The Town of Fairplay is the seat of Park County, Colorado.)	170	743	+2.62%	724	+6.63%	679	+11.31%	610
Kiowa† (Note: The Town of Kiowa is the seat of Elbert County, Colorado.)	171	738	+1.79%	725	+0.28%	723	+24.44%	581
Calhan	172	727	−4.59%	762	−2.31%	780	−12.95%	896
Cheyenne Wells† (Note: The Town of Cheyenne Wells is the seat of Cheyenne County, Colorado.)	173	722	−4.75%	758	−10.40%	846	−16.24%	1,010
Silverton† (Note: The Town of Silverton is the seat of San Juan County, Colorado.)	174	721	+15.92%	622	−2.35%	637	+19.96%	531
Silver Cliff	175	713	+17.08%	609	+3.75%	587	+14.65%	512
La Jara	176	708	−3.01%	730	−10.76%	818	−6.73%	877
Dove Creek† (Note: The Town of Dove Creek is the seat of Dolores County, Colorado.)	177	664	+4.57%	635	−13.61%	735	+5.30%	698
Hot Sulphur Springs† (Note: The Town of Hot Sulphur Springs is the seat of Grand County, Colorado.)	178	663	−3.49%	687	+3.62%	663	+27.26%	521
Stratton	179	644	−1.83%	656	−0.30%	658	−1.64%	669
Eads† (Note: The Town of Eads is the seat of Kiowa County, Colorado.)	180	642	−4.46%	672	+10.34%	609	−18.47%	747
Antonito	181	615	−4.95%	647	−17.16%	781	−10.54%	873
Green Mountain Falls	182	601	−6.97%	646	+0.94%	640	−17.21%	773
San Luis† (Note: The Town of San Luis is the seat of Costilla County, Colorado.) (Note: San Luis de la Culebra was settled on April 9, 1851, making San Luis the oldest continuously occupied community in the Colorado.)	183	597	−0.17%	598	−4.93%	629	−14.88%	739
Simla	184	587	−2.33%	601	−2.75%	618	−6.79%	663
Flagler	185	584	+3.00%	567	+1.07%	561	−8.33%	612
Swink	186	579	−4.14%	604	−2.11%	617	−11.35%	696
Nucla	187	577	−1.37%	585	−17.72%	711	−3.13%	734
Nunn	188	539	+6.94%	504	+21.15%	416	−11.68%	471
Rockvale	189	530	+3.72%	511	+4.93%	487	+14.32%	426
Walden† (Note: The Town of Walden is the seat of Jackson County, Colorado.)	190	529	−12.71%	606	−0.33%	608	−17.17%	734
Saguache† (Note: The Town of Saguache is the seat of Saguache County, Colorado.) (Note: The name "Saguache" is pronounced /səˈwætʃ/. This name comes from the Ute language noun "sawup" /səˈwʌp/ meaning "sand dunes". The Spanish language version of this name is usually spelled "Saguache", while the English language version is usually spelled "Sawatch".)	191	520	−3.53%	539	+11.13%	485	−16.09%	578
Mountain View	192	517	−4.44%	541	+6.71%	507	−10.90%	569
Norwood	193	516	−3.55%	535	+3.28%	518	+18.26%	438
Walsh	194	513	−5.52%	543	−0.55%	546	−24.48%	723
South Fork	195	506	−0.78%	510	+32.12%	386	−36.09%	604
Otis	196	502	−1.76%	511	+7.58%	475	−11.05%	534
Westcliffe† (Note: The Town of Westcliffe is the seat of Custer County, Colorado.)	197	488	+12.18%	435	−23.42%	568	+36.21%	417
Naturita	198	478	−1.44%	485	−11.17%	546	−14.02%	635
De Beque	199	476	−3.45%	493	−2.18%	504	+11.75%	451
Granada	200	463	+4.04%	445	−13.93%	517	−19.22%	640
Aguilar	201	445	−2.41%	456	−15.24%	538	−9.27%	593
Wiley	202	433	−0.92%	437	+7.90%	405	−16.15%	483
Fleming	203	421	−1.64%	428	+4.90%	408	−4.23%	426
Lake City† (Note: The Town of Lake City is the seat of Hinsdale County, Colorado.)	204	416	−3.70%	432	+5.88%	408	+8.80%	375
Crawford	205	411	+1.99%	403	−6.50%	431	+17.76%	366
Grand Lake	206	402	−1.95%	410	−12.95%	471	+5.37%	447
Yampa	207	373	−6.52%	399	−6.99%	429	−3.16%	443
Morrison	208	364	−8.08%	396	−7.48%	428	−0.47%	430
Coal Creek (Note: The Town of Coal Creek should not be confused with the Coal Creek CDP.)	209	361	−0.82%	364	+6.12%	343	+13.20%	303
Victor	210	361	−4.75%	379	−4.53%	397	−10.79%	445
Collbran	211	355	−3.79%	369	−47.88%	708	+82.47%	388
Rico	212	347	+20.49%	288	+8.68%	265	+29.27%	205
Blanca	213	320	−0.62%	322	−16.36%	385	−1.53%	391
Manzanola	214	319	−6.45%	341	−21.43%	434	−17.33%	525
Empire	215	317	−8.12%	345	+22.34%	282	−20.56%	355
Alma	216	312	+5.41%	296	+9.63%	270	+50.84%	179
Hillrose	217	312	0.00%	312	+18.18%	264	+3.94%	254
Romeo	218	309	+2.32%	302	−25.25%	404	+7.73%	375
Boone	219	305	0.00%	305	−10.03%	339	+4.95%	323
Olney Springs	220	288	−8.57%	315	−8.70%	345	−11.31%	389
Merino	221	276	−1.78%	281	−1.06%	284	+15.45%	246
Creede† (Note: In 1892, two rival municipalities with the name Creede were incorporated in the Creede Mining District of southwestern Colorado. On March 19, 1892, the Town of Creede was incorporated around the Creede, Colorado, post office along Willow Creek in Saguache County. On June 13, 1892, the rival City of Creede was incorporated around the Amethyst, Colorado, post office just 1.1 miles (1.8 km) south along Willow Creek. On March 27, 1893, Mineral County was created, and on November 7, 1893, county voters selected the City of Creede as the new county seat. To avoid further confusion, the United States Post Office Department changed the name of the Creede post office to North Creede, Colorado, on November 28 1908, and changed the name of the Amethyst post office to Creede, Colorado, on February 9, 1909. As silver mining declined, both municipalities lost population, and in 1916, the City of Creede became a statutory town, but continued to use the appellation City of Creede to distinguish itself from its northern rival. On April 15, 1919, the North Creede post office closed, and the Town of Creede soon ceased operation. It was not until July 23, 2026, that the Colorado Secretary of State declared the Town of Creede abandoned. The Geographic Names Information System (GNIS) uses the name "Town of the City of Creede" to identify the county seat and sole surviving municipality of Mineral County.)	222	275	+7.00%	257	−11.38%	290	−23.08%	377
Ovid	223	256	−5.54%	271	−14.78%	318	−3.64%	330
Garden City	224	250	−1.57%	254	+8.55%	234	−34.45%	357
Kit Carson	225	250	−1.96%	255	+9.44%	233	−7.91%	253
Iliff	226	246	0.00%	246	−7.52%	266	+24.88%	213
Jamestown	227	245	−4.30%	256	−6.57%	274	+33.66%	205
Dinosaur	228	242	−0.41%	243	−28.32%	339	+6.27%	319
Red Cliff	229	238	−7.39%	257	−3.75%	267	−7.61%	289
Sugar City	230	238	−8.11%	259	+0.39%	258	−7.53%	279
Brookside	231	235	−0.42%	236	+1.29%	233	+6.39%	219
Eckley	232	232	0.00%	232	−9.73%	257	−7.55%	278
Cheraw	233	223	−5.91%	237	−5.95%	252	+19.43%	211
Larkspur	234	219	+6.31%	206	+12.57%	183	−21.79%	234
Arriba	235	203	+0.50%	202	+4.66%	193	−20.90%	244
Peetz	236	202	−5.16%	213	−10.50%	238	+4.85%	227
Rye	237	201	−2.43%	206	+34.64%	153	−24.26%	202
Bethune	238	190	+3.83%	183	−22.78%	237	+5.33%	225
Ophir	239	185	−6.09%	197	+23.90%	159	+40.71%	113
Silver Plume	240	180	−13.04%	207	+21.76%	170	−16.26%	203
Seibert	241	178	+3.49%	172	−4.97%	181	+0.56%	180
Crestone	242	166	+17.73%	141	+11.02%	127	+73.97%	73
Sedgwick	243	162	−5.81%	172	+17.81%	146	−23.56%	191
Genoa	244	156	+1.96%	153	+10.07%	139	−34.12%	211
Crowley	245	155	−6.63%	166	−5.68%	176	−5.88%	187
Grover	246	152	−3.18%	157	+14.60%	137	−10.46%	153
Marble	247	133	0.00%	133	+1.53%	131	+24.76%	105
Crook	248	125	−6.02%	133	+20.91%	110	−14.06%	128
Ward	249	124	−3.12%	128	−14.67%	150	−11.24%	169
Cokedale	250	123	−3.15%	127	−1.55%	129	−7.19%	139
Black Hawk	251	120	−5.51%	127	+7.63%	118	0.00%	118
Raymer (Note: The Town of Raymer is served by the New Raymer post office, creating some confusion about the town's name.)	252	111	+0.91%	110	+14.58%	96	+5.49%	91
Pritchett	253	106	−5.36%	112	−20.00%	140	+2.19%	137
Ramah	254	105	−5.41%	111	−9.76%	123	+5.13%	117
Moffat	255	102	−5.56%	108	−6.90%	116	+1.75%	114
Vilas	256	99	+1.02%	98	−14.04%	114	+3.64%	110
Campo	257	95	−7.77%	103	−5.50%	109	−27.33%	150
Vona	258	89	−6.32%	95	−10.38%	106	+11.58%	95
Hooper	259	77	−4.94%	81	−21.36%	103	−16.26%	123
Pitkin	260	74	+2.78%	72	+9.09%	66	−46.77%	124
Montezuma	261	72	−2.70%	74	+13.85%	65	+54.76%	42
Haswell	262	71	0.00%	71	+4.41%	68	−19.05%	84
Starkville	263	66	+6.45%	62	+5.08%	59	−53.91%	128
Kim	264	63	0.00%	63	−14.86%	74	+13.85%	65
Branson	265	57	0.00%	57	−22.97%	74	−3.90%	77
Sheridan Lake	266	56	+1.82%	55	−37.50%	88	+33.33%	66
Hartman		55	−1.79%	56	−30.86%	81	−27.03%	111
Paoli	267	48	−5.88%	51	+50.00%	34	−19.05%	42
Sawpit	268	34	−10.53%	38	−5.00%	40	+60.00%	25
Two Buttes	269	30	−11.76%	34	−20.93%	43	−35.82%	67
Bonanza	270	NA	NA	17	+6.25%	16	+14.29%	14
Lakeside	271	16	0.00%	16	+100.00%	8	−60.00%	20
Carbonate (Note: On November 4, 2014, the property owners of Carbonate, Colorado voted 9 to 0 to reactivate the town government despite having no year-round residents since the 1890 United States census.)	272	0	NA	0	NA	0	NA	0
Colorado municipalities (Note: The 2025 municipal population totals for Colorado exclude the Town of Bonanza for which there are no 2025 population estimates.)		4,477,905	+4.14%	4,299,886	+17.13%	3,671,153	+21.36%	3,024,958

== Municipal government ==
The List of municipalities in Colorado contains information about the government of each of these municipalities and the counties in which they lie. That list also contains 2020 census information about the land area and population density of these municipalities. In addition, that list contains the municipal websites and the geographic coordinates of these municipalities.

== Gallery ==
The 20 most populous Colorado municipalities

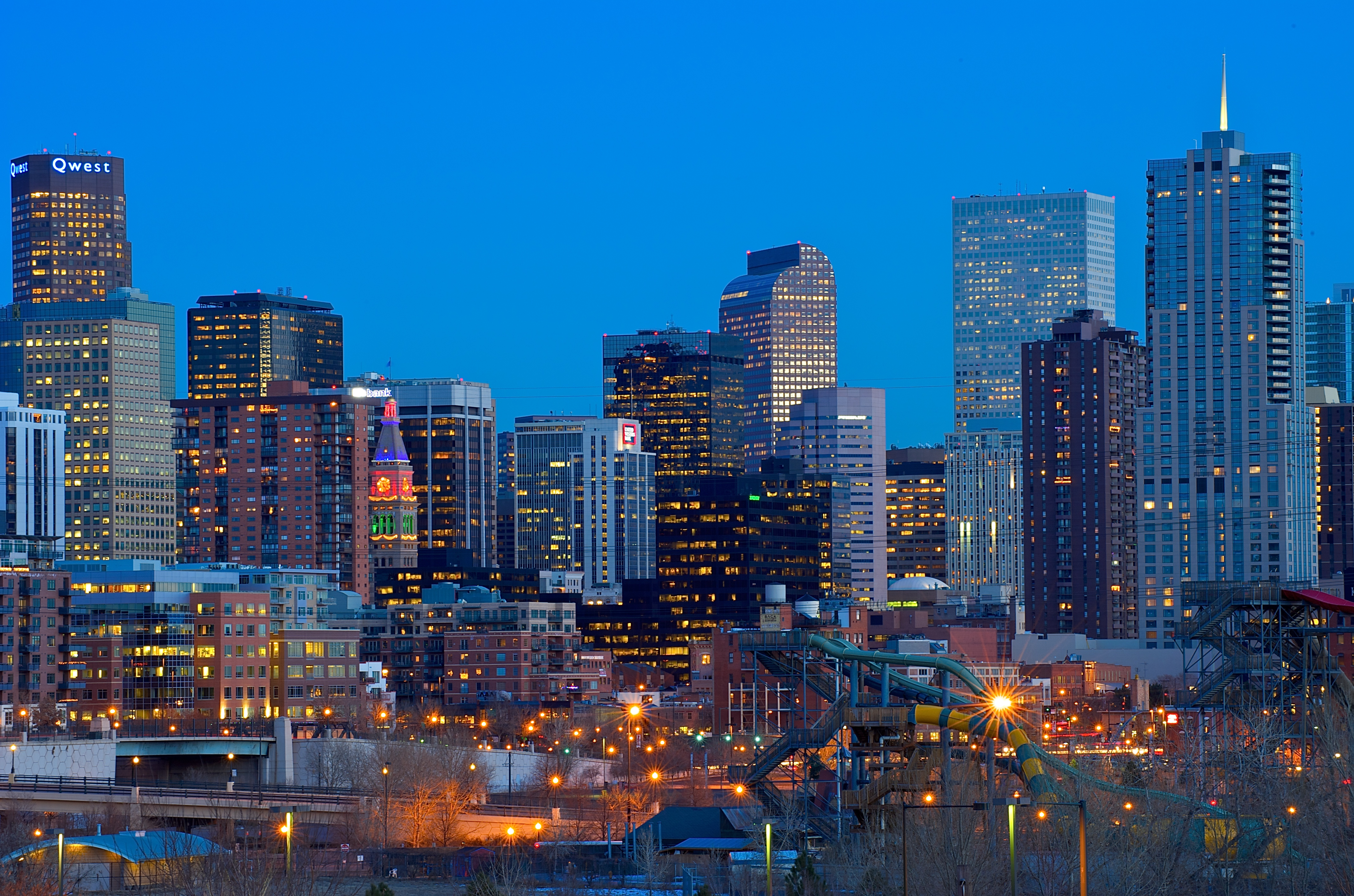
1. Denver, the "Mile-High City", is the state capital and the most populous city.

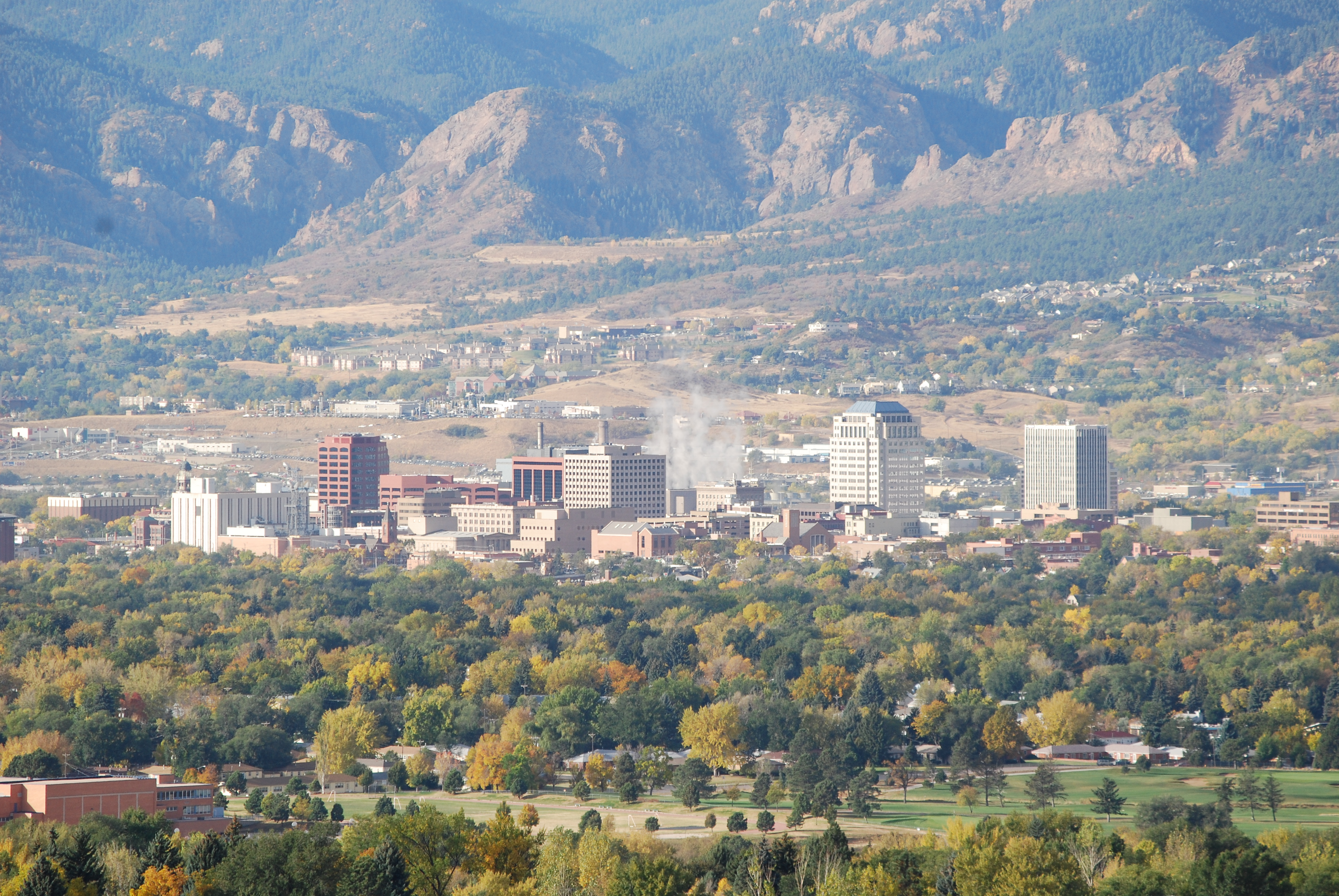
2. Colorado Springs is the center of a military, technical, and recreational complex at the foot of Pikes Peak.

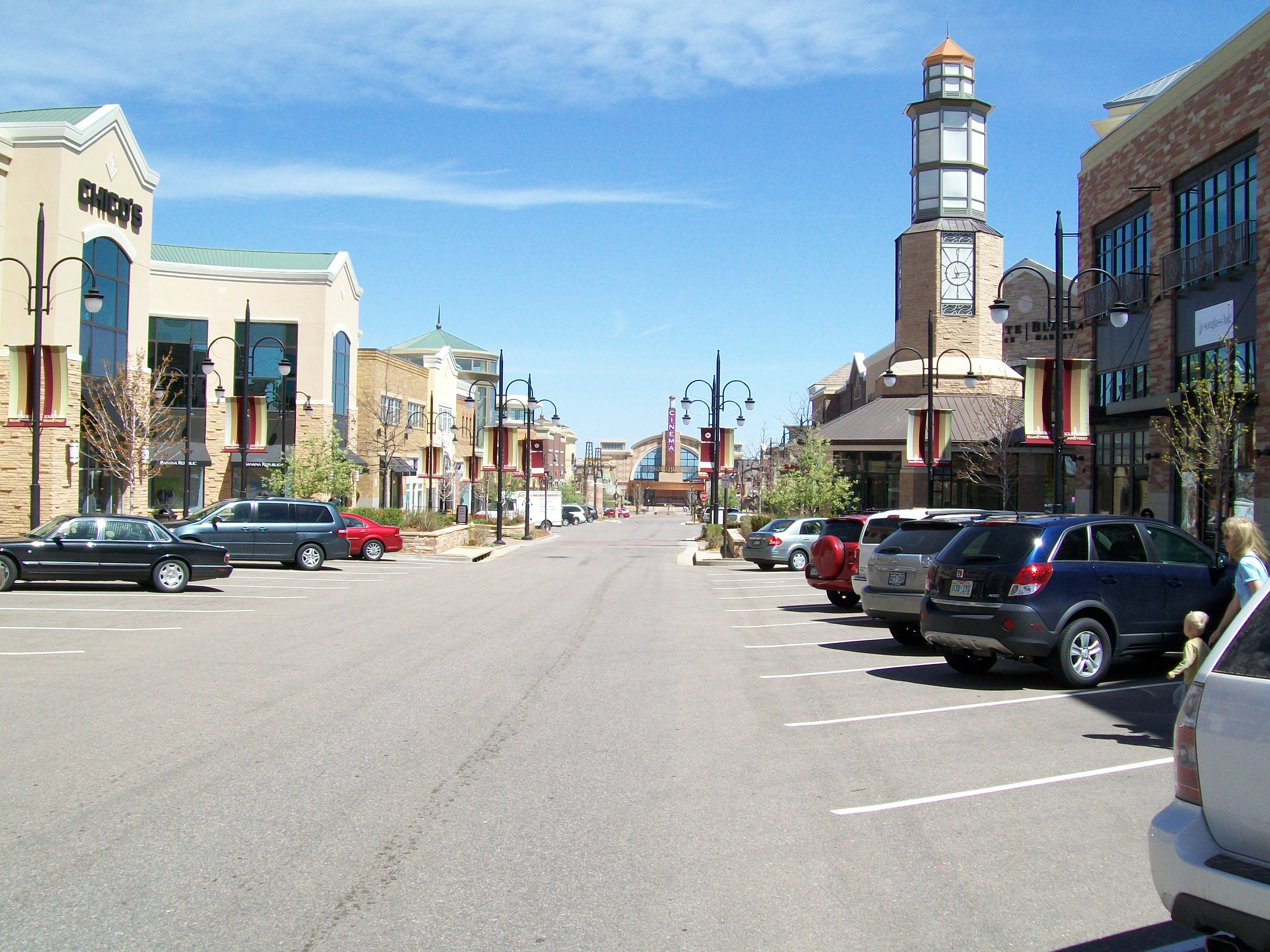
3. Aurora, Denver's twin city, is home of the regional Anschutz Medical Campus.

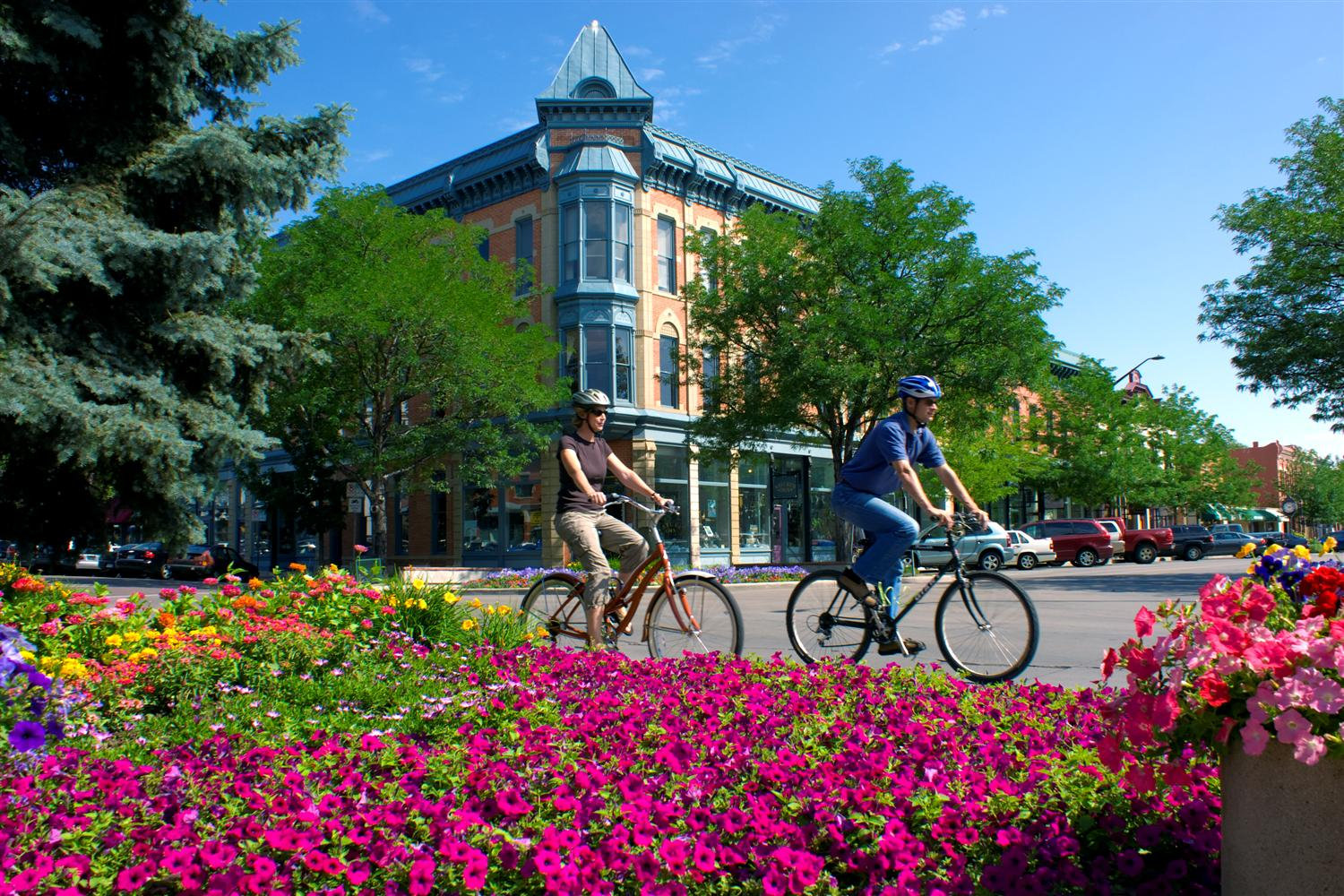
4. Fort Collins is a research center and home of Colorado State University.

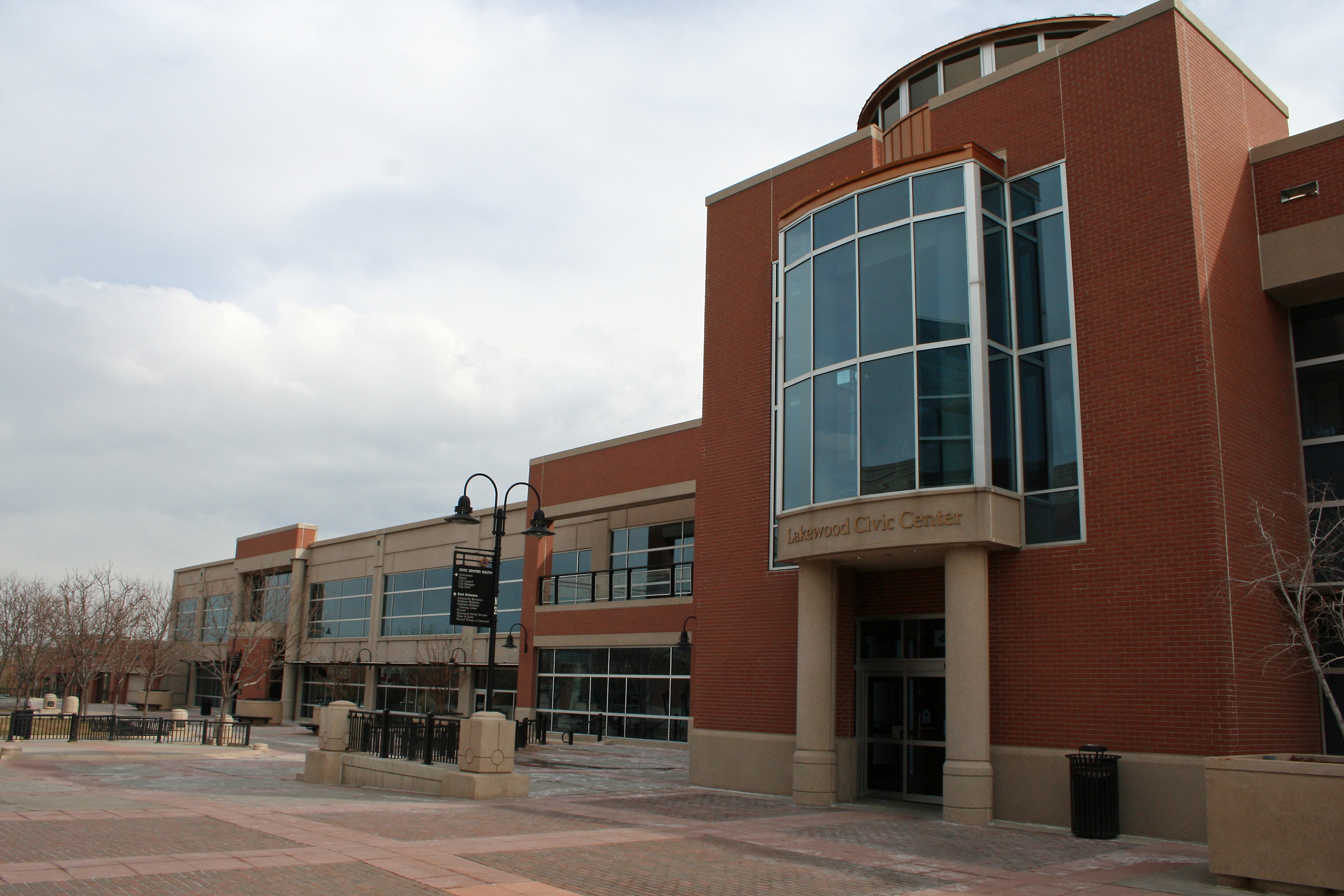
5. Lakewood is home of the Denver Federal Center, the largest federal complex outside Washington, D.C.

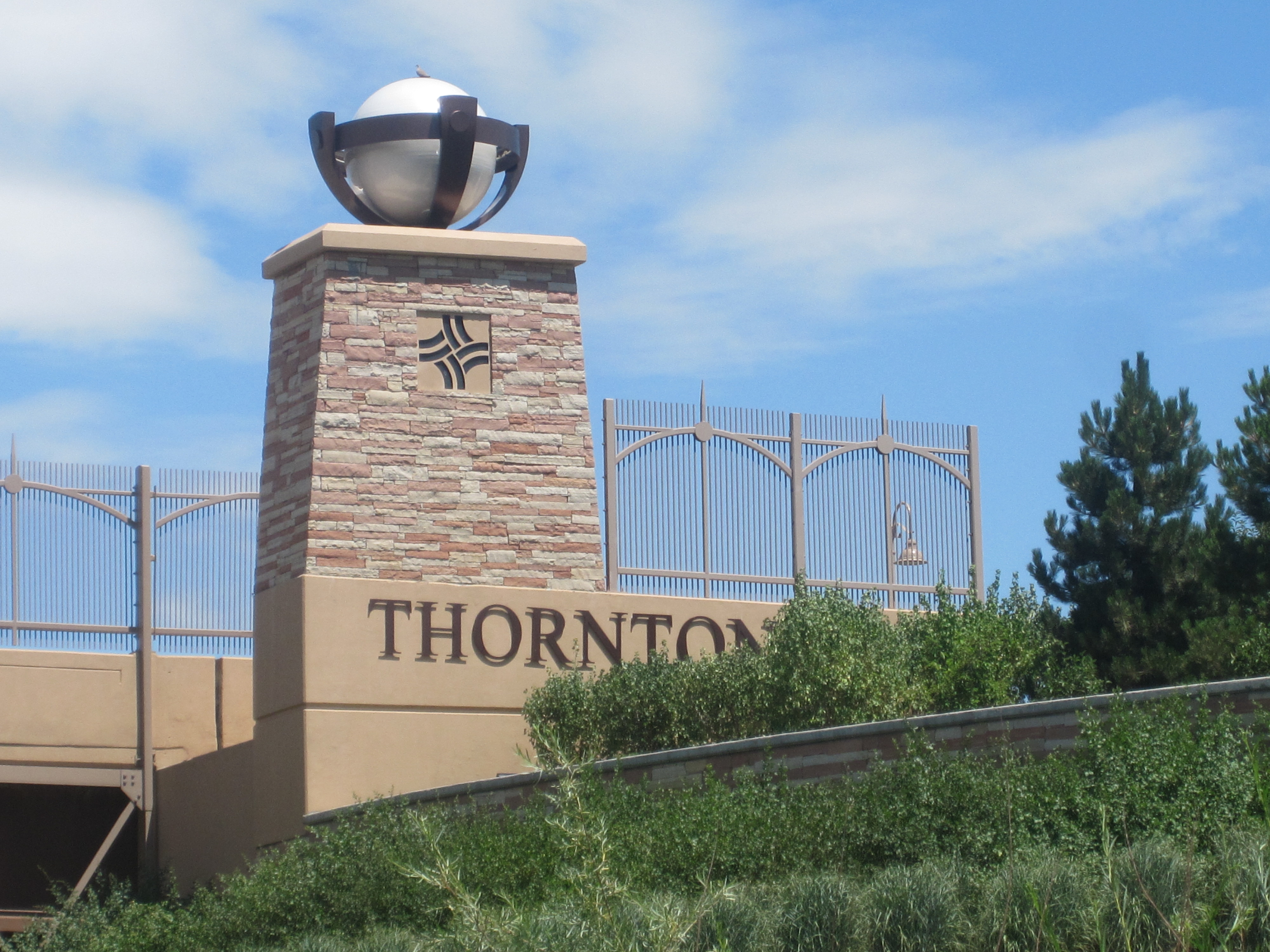
6. Thornton is a residential community that is the northern gateway to Metropolitan Denver.

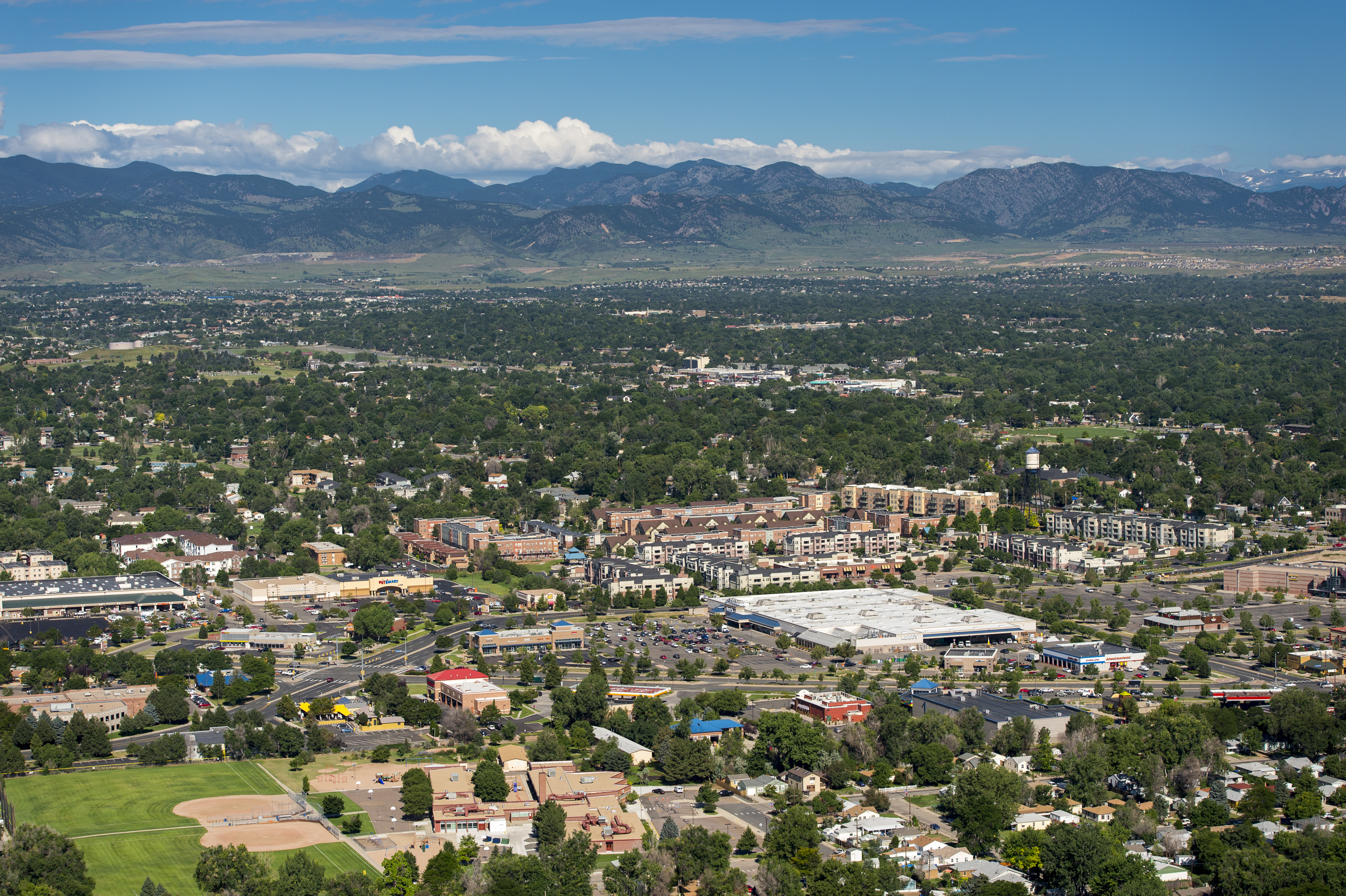
7. Arvada is the site of the first recorded gold discovery in the Rocky Mountain region.

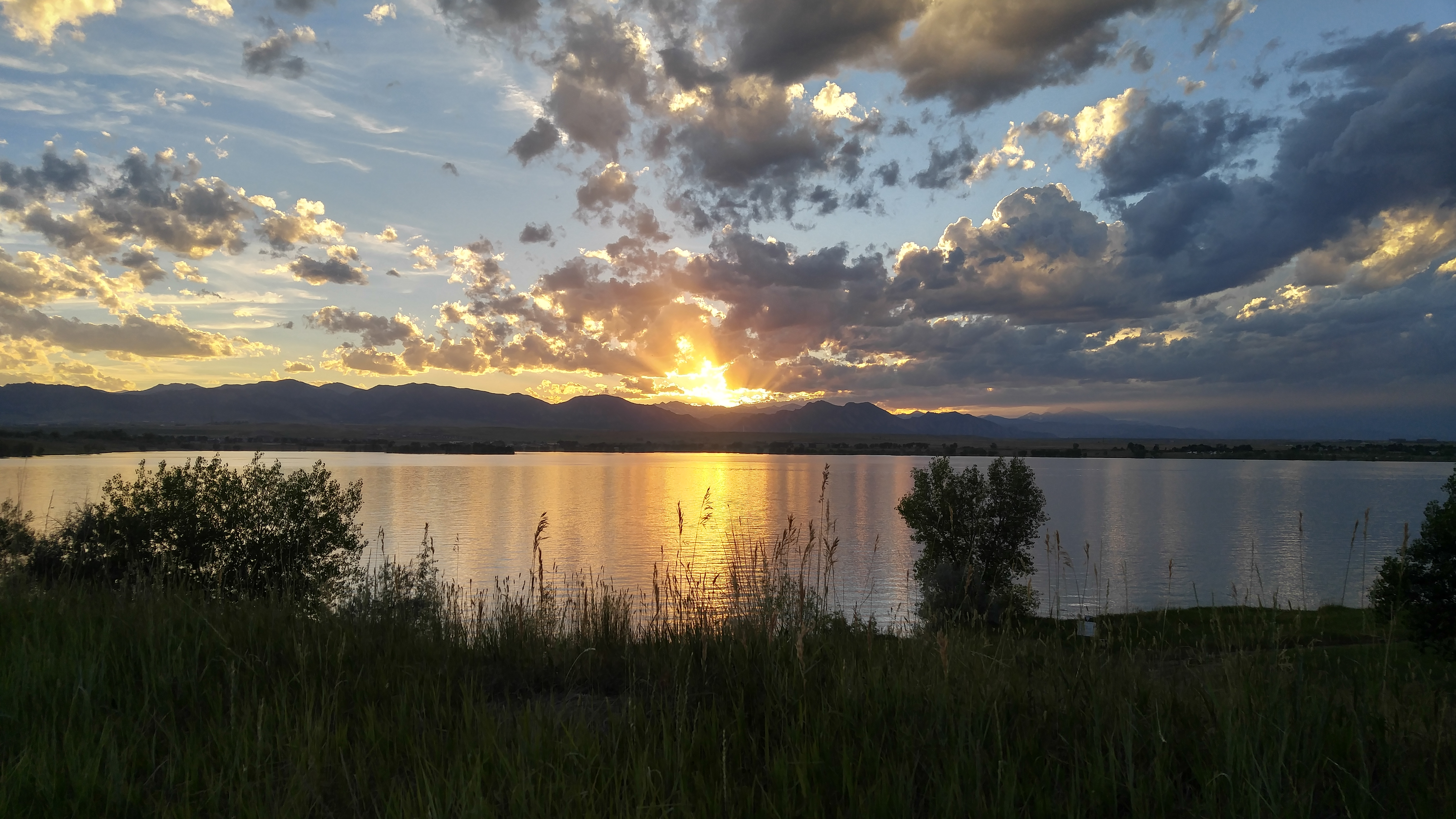
8. Westminster is a northwestern Denver suburb.

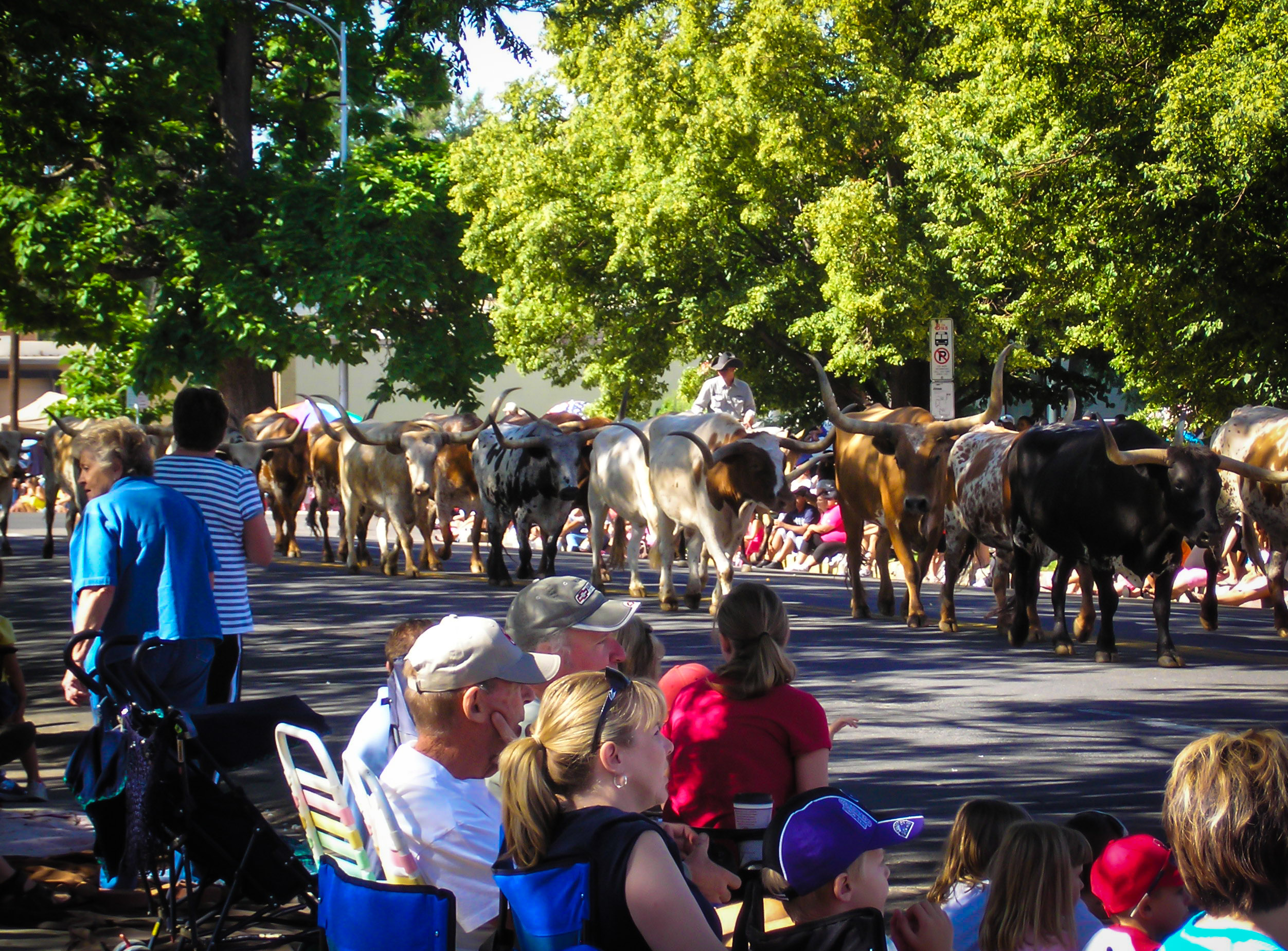
9. Greeley hosts the Greeley Stampede each July.

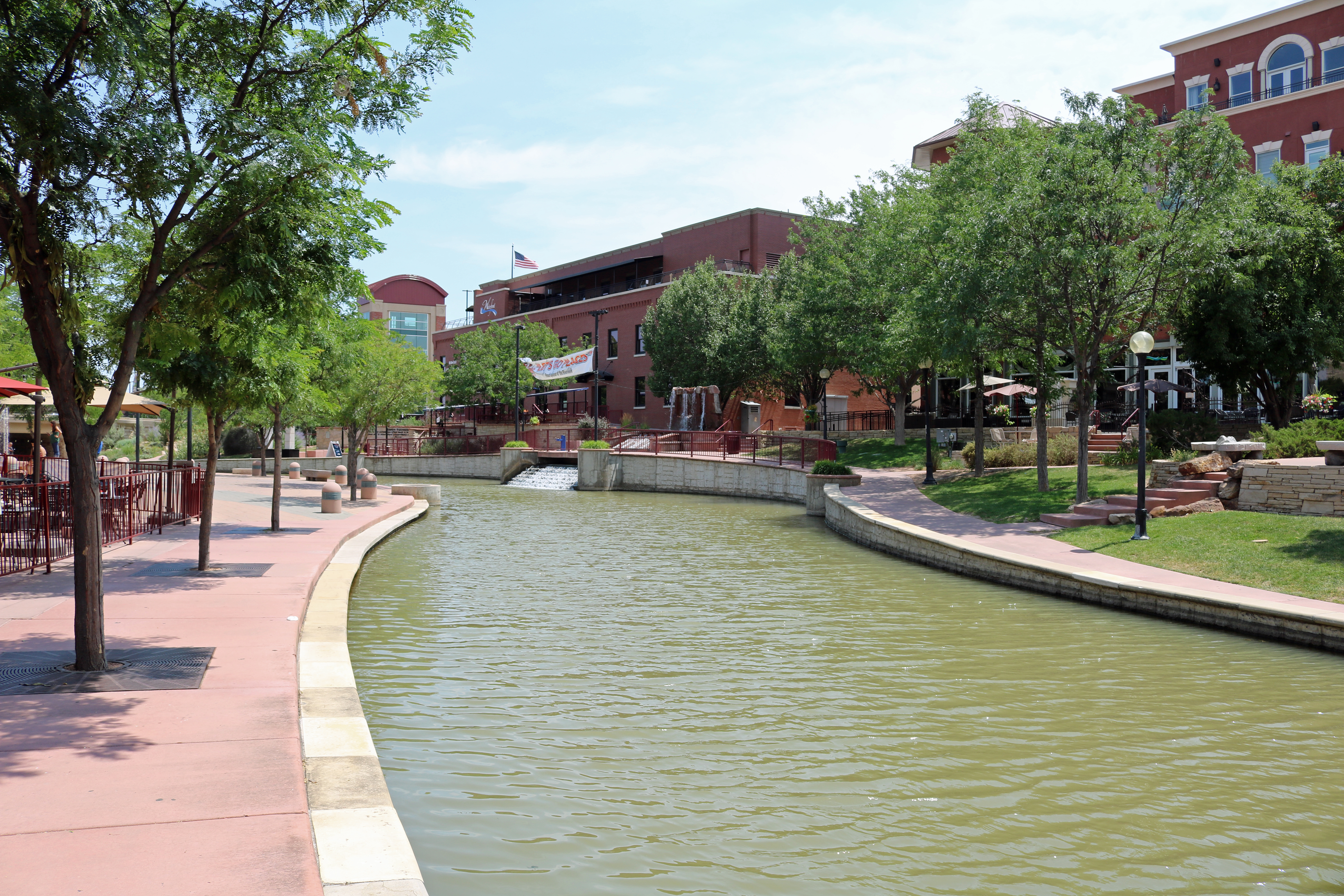
10. Pueblo straddles the Arkansas River, once the border between the United States and Spain.

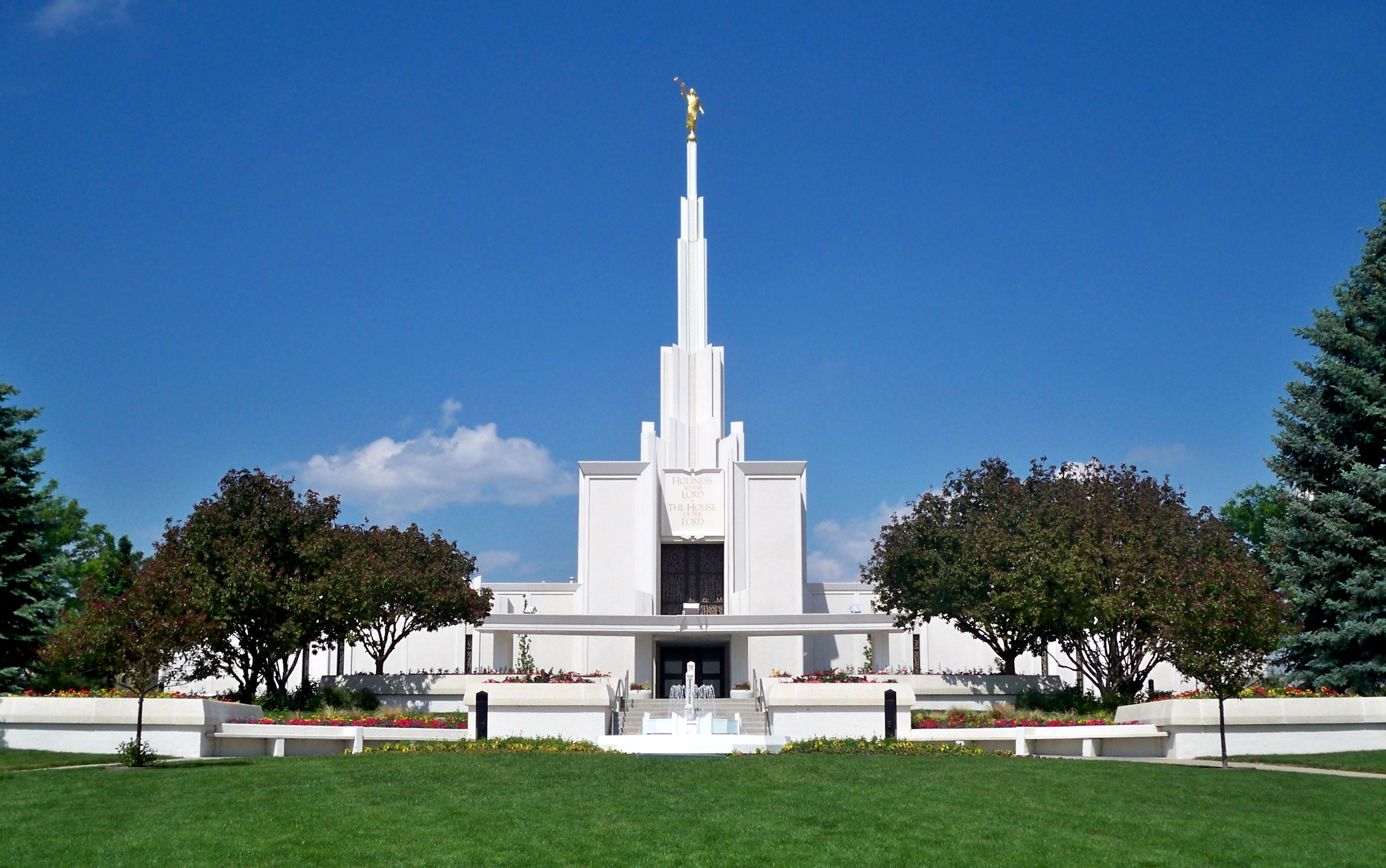
11. Centennial is home of the Denver Area Temple of the Church of Jesus Christ of Latter-day Saints.

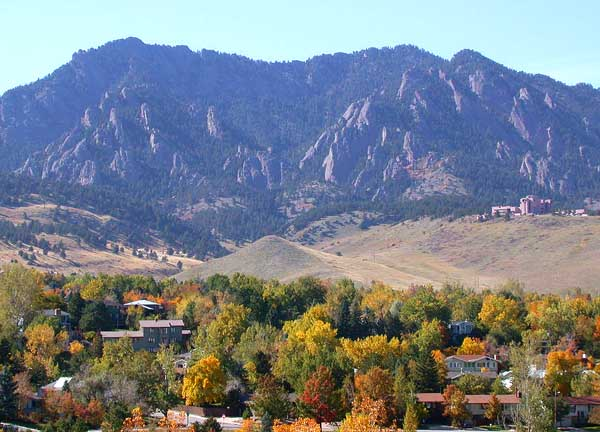
12. Boulder is a research center and home of the University of Colorado.

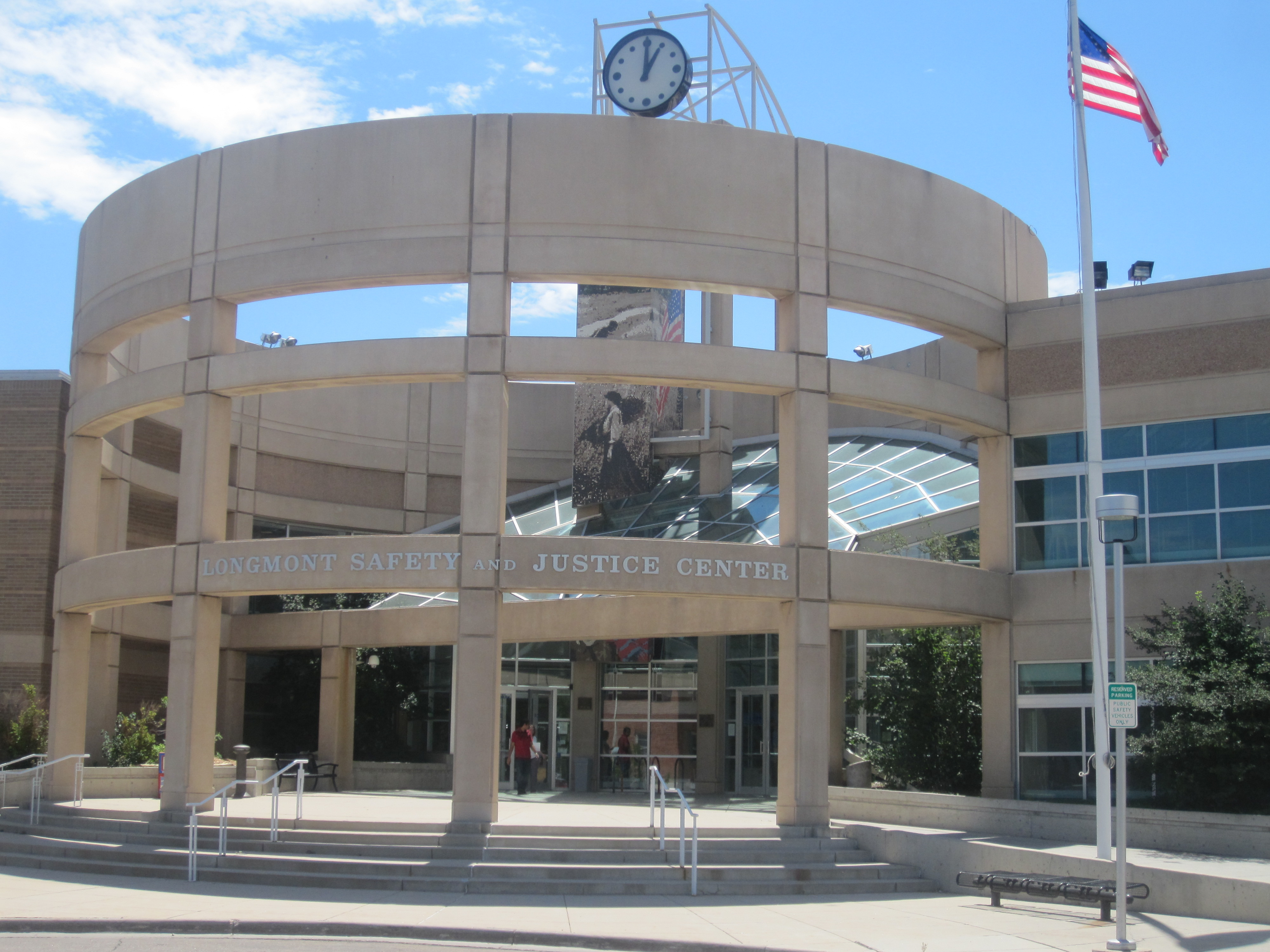
13. Longmont is a farm town turned high-tech center.

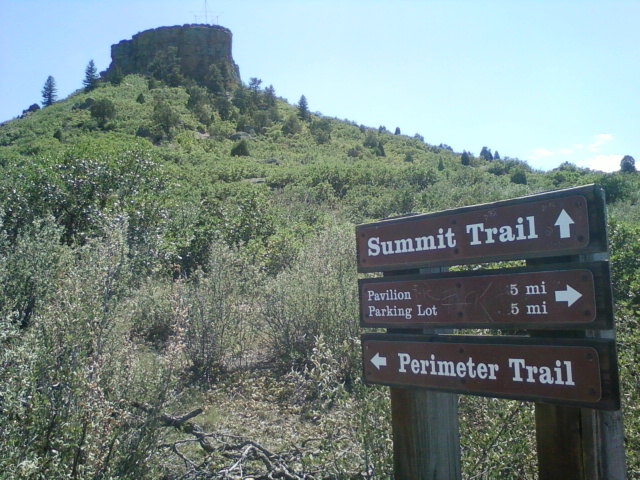
14. Castle Rock is a residential community between Denver and Colorado Springs.

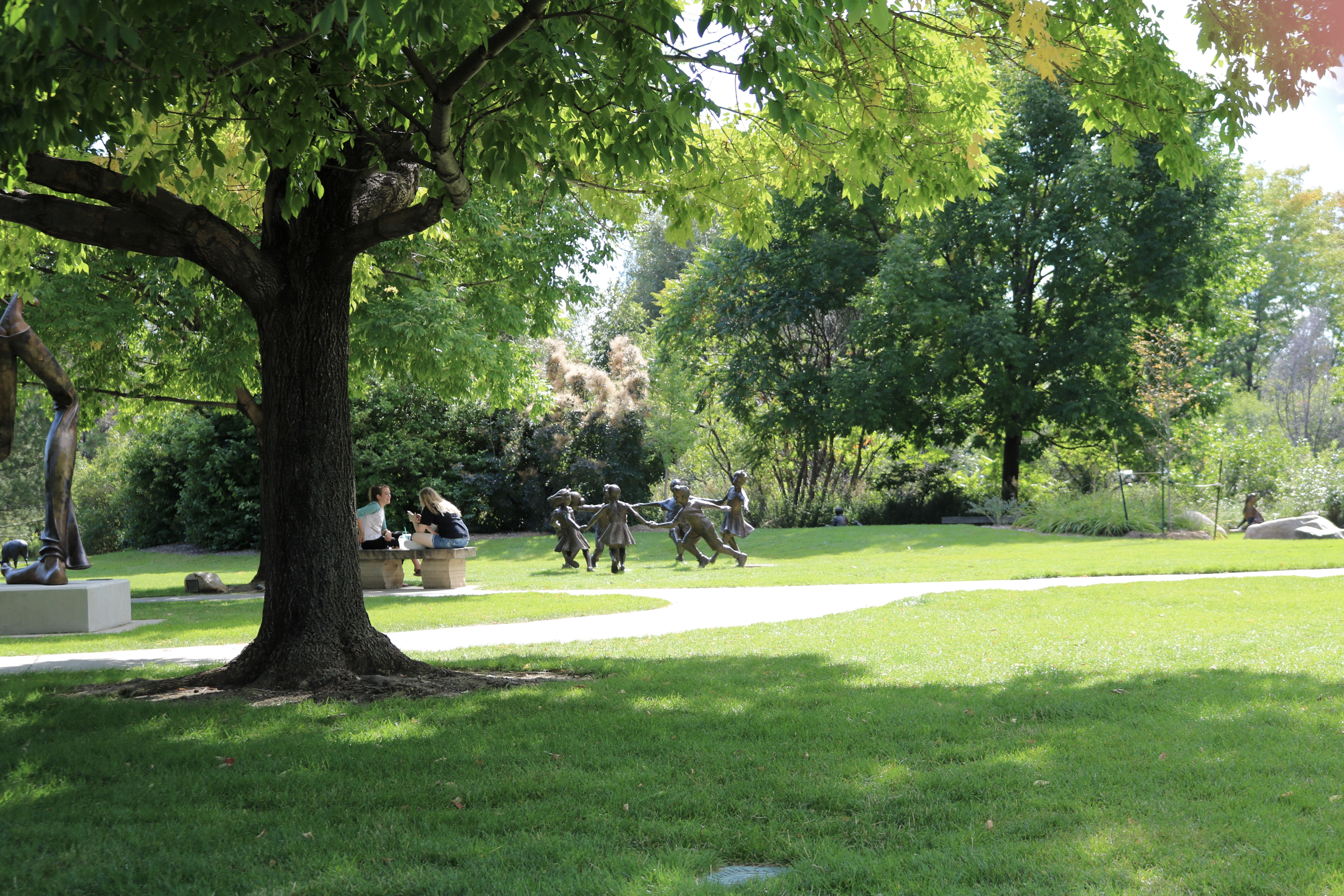
15. Loveland, the "Sweetheart City", is the gateway to Rocky Mountain National Park.

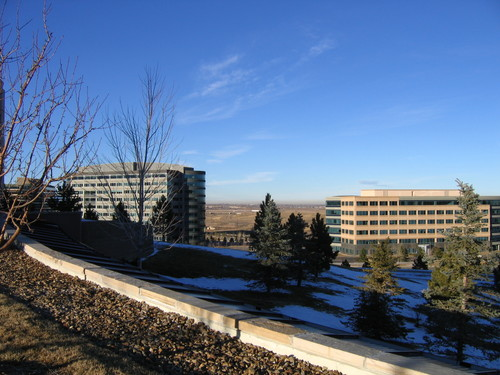
16. Broomfield is a high-tech center midway between Denver and Boulder.

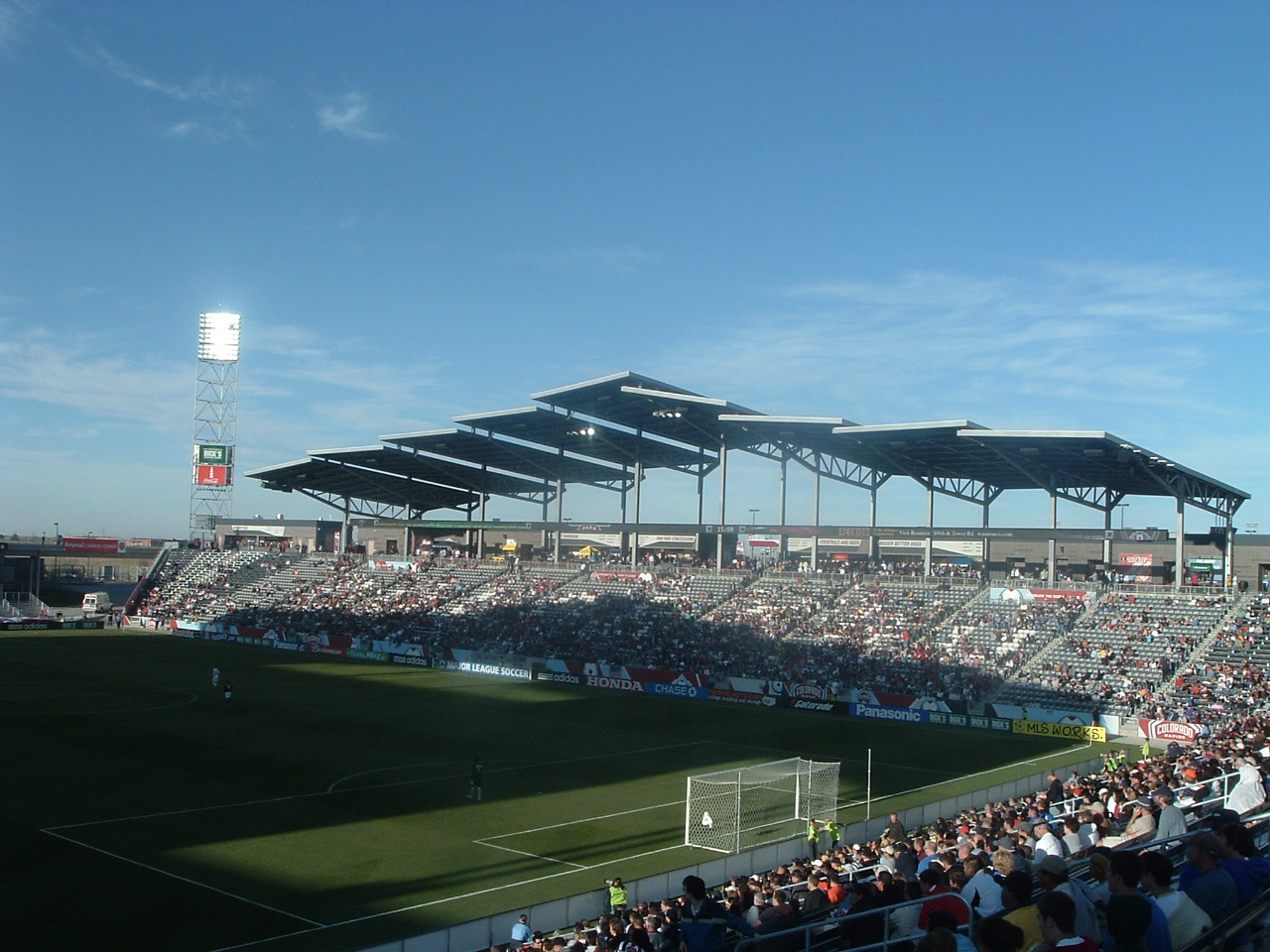
17. Commerce City is a residential community near Denver International Airport.

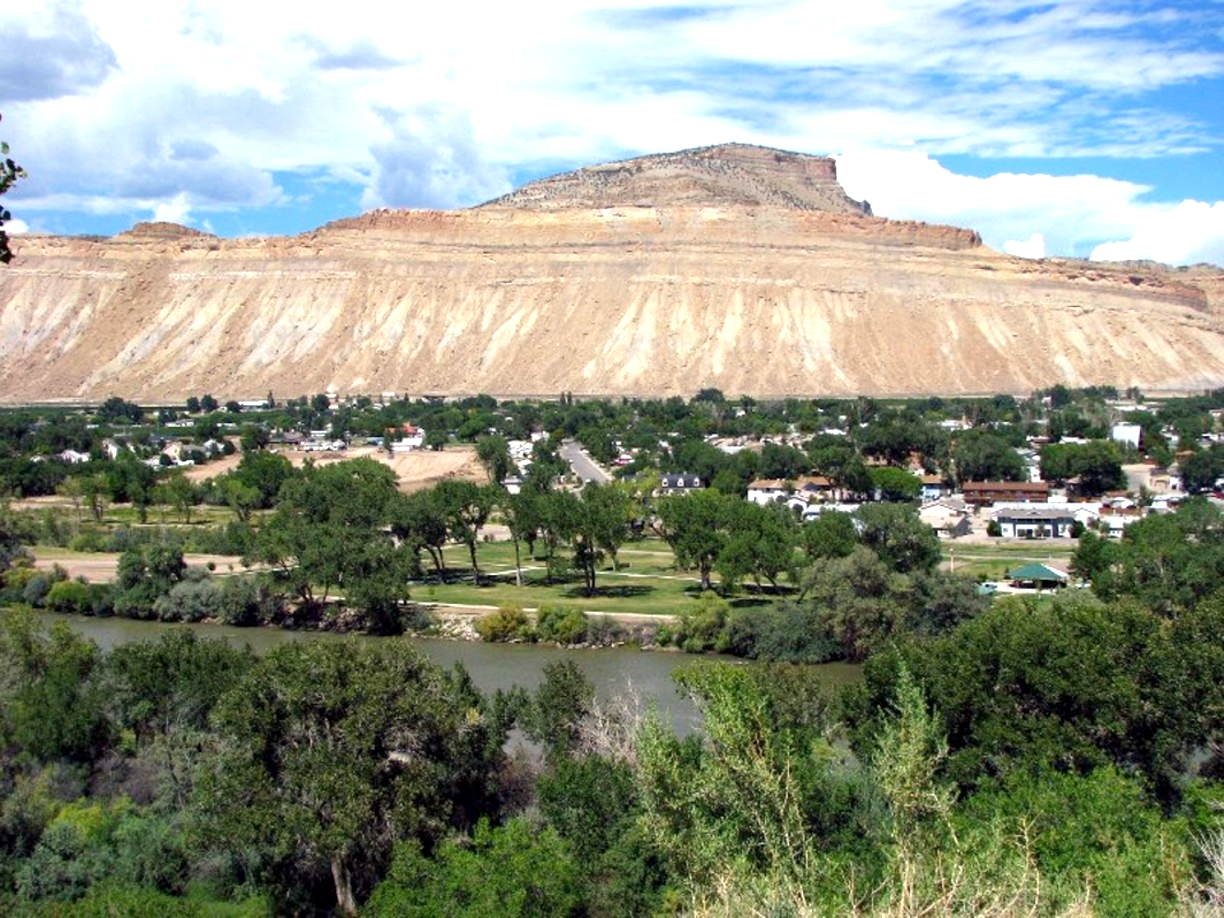
18. Grand Junction is the most populous city of western Colorado and the entire Colorado Plateau.

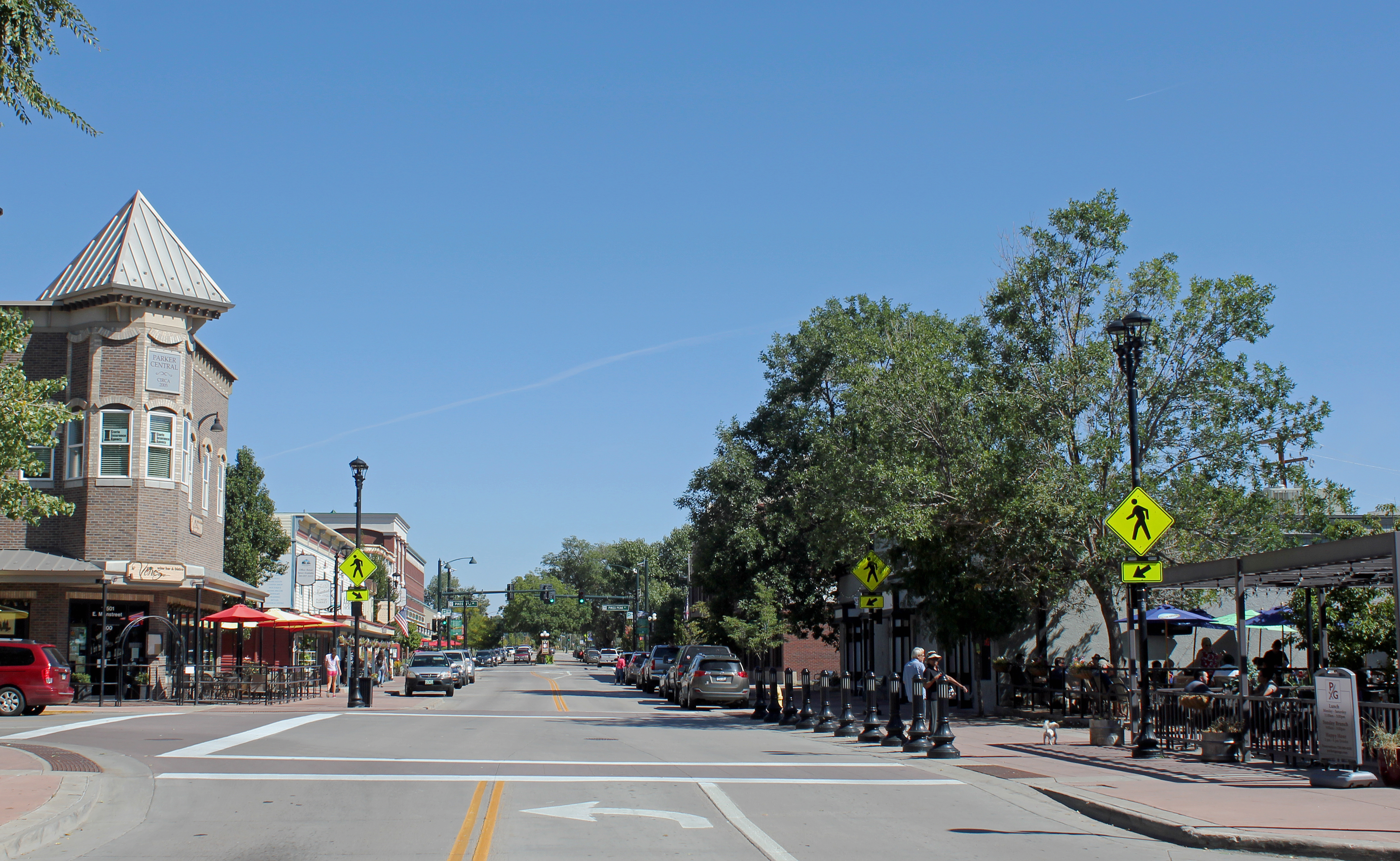
19. Parker is a residential community southeast of Denver.

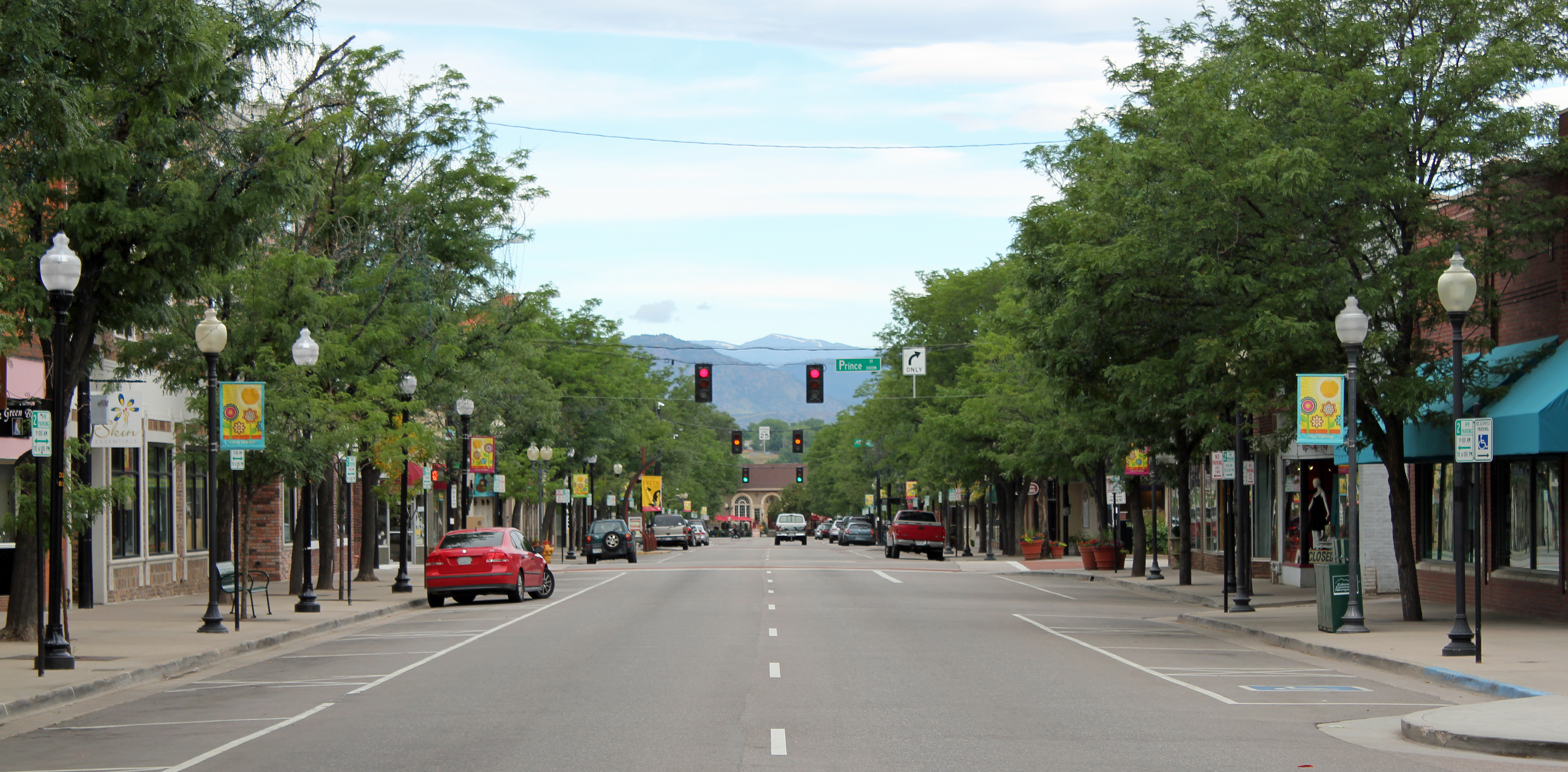
20. Littleton is a farm town turned Denver suburb.

== See also ==
- Bibliography of Colorado
- Geography of Colorado
- History of Colorado
- Index of Colorado-related articles
- List of Colorado-related lists
- Outline of Colorado
