= Emergenetics International =

- Company type: Private
- Industry: Business consulting, behavioral studies
- Founded: 1991
- Founder: Geil Browning, CEO
- Headquarters: Centennial, Colorado
- Area served: International
- Services: Consulting
- Website: https://www.emergenetics.com

Emergenetics International is an organizational development company based out of North America and operating in Asia and Europe. The company works with businesses, individuals, and schools. It was founded by CEO Geil Browning, Ph.D. in 1991. Browning developed the Emergenetics Profile with Wendell Williams, Ph.D., that includes an assessment test to designate individuals by four thinking attributes (analytical, structural, social and conceptual) and three behavioral attributes (expressiveness, assertiveness and flexibility). The company began certifying trainers, human resource professionals and coaches in 1998 and has since profiled thousands of individuals globally.

Since 2012, Emergenetics International has been ranked on Inc. Magazine's "Inc. 5000" list of the fastest growing companies in the United States seven times.
