= Agler–La Follette House =

Historic house in Ohio, United States

- U.S. National Register of Historic Places
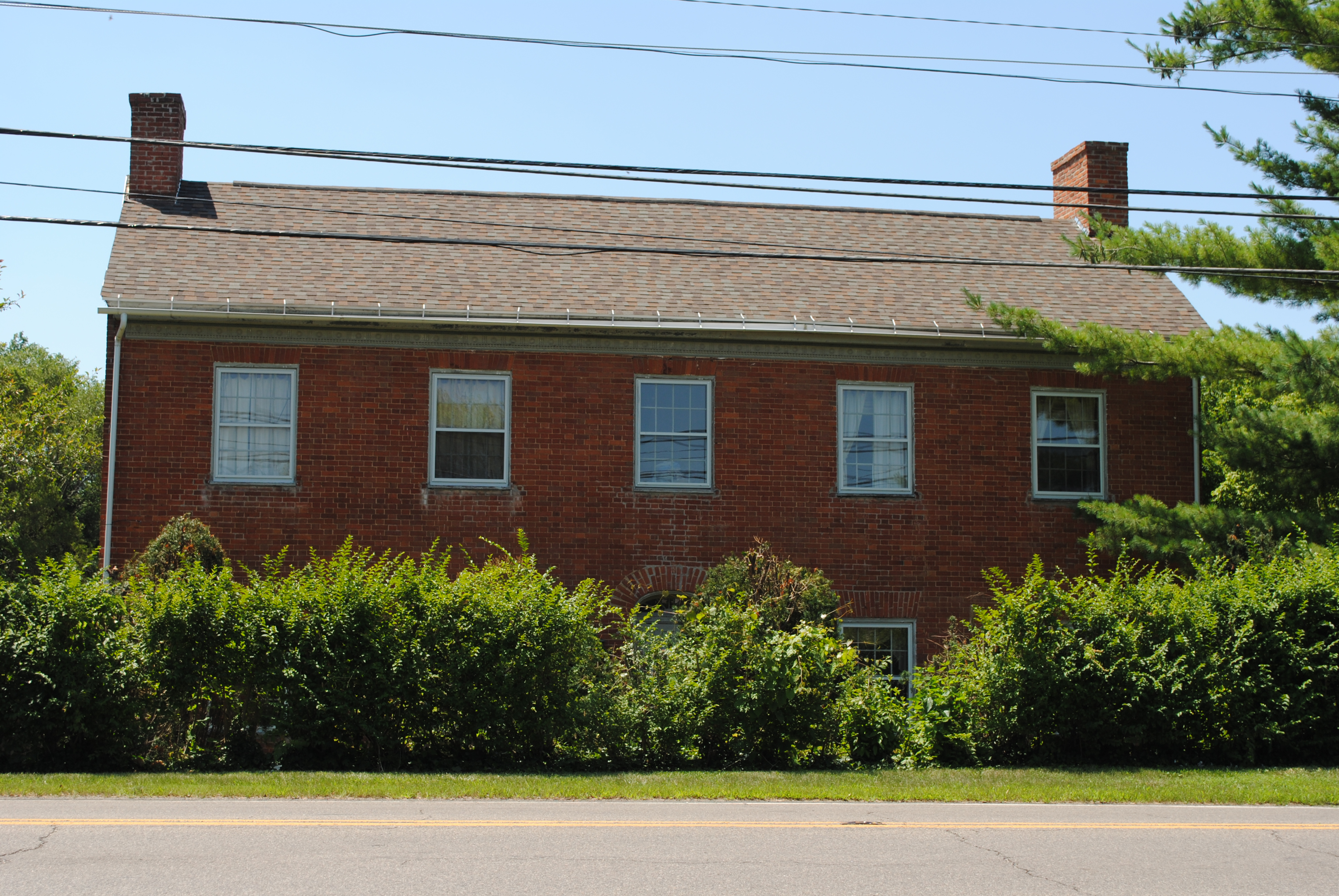

- Location within Ohio Location within the United States
- Location: 2621 Sunbury Road, Columbus, Ohio
- Coordinates: 40°1′28.55″N 82°56′1.90″W
- Built: c. 1824
- Architectural style: Federal
- NRHP reference No.: 78002062
- Added to NRHP: December 14, 1978

Agler–La Follette House is a historic house in Mifflin Township near Columbus, Ohio. It was added to the National Register of Historic Places on December 14, 1978.

== Historic uses ==
The home was originally built around 1824 for Frederick Agler who, with his family, was one of the first settlers to Mifflin Township in 1806. Agler would rise to prominence in the local community and later be elected Mifflin Township Justice of the Peace in 1811.
