= Vickie Agler =

Politician and consultant in Colorado

Vickie Agler is a consultant and former state legislator who served in Colorado. A Republican, she lived in Littleton, Colorado. A Republican she served in 1991, 1993, and 1995.

She was born in St. Joseph, Missouri. In 2004 she became the director for the National Federation of Independent Business' Colorado office.

In 1997 she was involved in a debate over the Denver Broncos' stadium.
