= Ardentinny =

Coordinates: 56.046506°N 4.9122174°W

Ardentinny: Scottish Gaelic: Àird an Teine
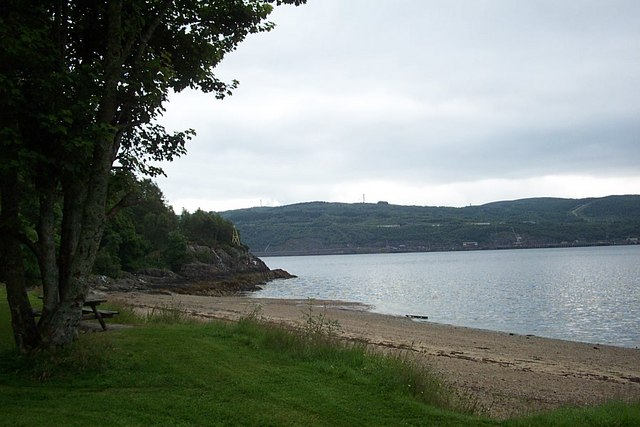
- Shepherd's Point on Loch Long

- Location within Argyll and Bute
- Population: 177 (2001)
- OS grid reference: NS 18712 87563
- Council area: Argyll and Bute
- Lieutenancy area: Argyll and Bute
- Country: Scotland
- Sovereign state: United Kingdom
- Post town: DUNOON, ARGYLL
- Postcode district: PA23
- Dialling code: 01369
- UK Parliament: Argyll, Bute and South Lochaber
- Scottish Parliament: Argyll and Bute

Ardentinny (Scottish Gaelic: Àird an Teine or Àird an t-Sionnaich) is a small village on the western shore of Loch Long, 14 miles (23 km) north of Dunoon in Argyll and Bute, Scotland.

Nearby is Cruach a' Chaise (Cheese Hill). On the opposite side of Loch Long is the village of Coulport, home of RNAD Coulport, the storage and loading base for the UK's Trident submarine fleet, part of the extensive HMNB Clyde.

The name Ardentinny comes from Gaelic Àird an Teine meaning "hill of fire", deriving either from the ancient rite of lighting fires to the god Bel on 1 May or from warning fires to aid mariners. It was the fife of the McInturner's Baron's Craigcoll, Ardentinny & Glenfinart before they were murdered by Clan Campbell for supporting Clan Lamont in the reign of Robert the Bruce. The ferry between Ardentinny and Coulport was summoned by the namesake fire and was used by the Dukes of Argyll travelling between Dunoon, Inveraray and Rosneath Castle and in later years by drovers from Argyll travelling to the markets in Central Scotland. The alternate Gaelic name of Àird an t-Sionnaich is a back-formation from the sound of the English name.

The village had two hotels catering for the general public. The Ardentinny Outdoor Centre is run by Actual Reality, which has two centres in Cowal.

The local economy is reliant on tourism and agriculture, with major employers being the outdoor centre and the caravan park. There was one working fishing boat based in Ardentinny, trawling for prawns but that no longer resides there. Residents also work in Dunoon and across the Clyde. The village is served by the 489 (direct) and 486 (via Kilmun) bus service to and from Dunoon.

There are many holiday home rentals now being offered to tourists, as Ardentinny is within Argyll Forest Park, which is itself within Loch Lomond and The Trossachs National Park.

The Ardentinny Hotel was struck by lightning on 19 May 2014. It re-opened in June 2017, after refurbishment, as a bar and bistro named The Ardentinny.

In the village is the grave of Archibald Douglas, who made his fortune from sugar plantations in the West Indies. The site, known as Laird's Grave, also hosts one of the tallest trees in Scotland, a Douglas Fir which has been measured as between 65.2m and 68.6m tall.

== Education ==
Ardentinny had a primary school until 1997, when it was closed due to falling pupil numbers. Children in the village are now sent to nearby Strone Primary School. The school had been proposed for closure in 1987 and the case was covered by the Yorkshire Television documentary series First Tuesday. The only secondary school in Cowal is Dunoon Grammar School, and students from the village are bussed there each day.

== Leisure ==
There is a path from the village along the shore to Carrick Castle on Loch Goil.

== In literature ==
The village of Ardentinny is featured in Don Brown's historical fiction novel Destiny, the prequel to his Navy Justice Series.

== Notable people ==
- John Craig, Scottish classicist, and his brother Robert Meldrum Craig, FRSE, were born in Ardentinny.
- George Gardner, botanist, was born in Ardentinny in 1810.
- Paul Murton, TV presenter/broadcaster of the Grand Tours of Scotland series, was raised in Ardentinny.

== See also ==
- Carrick Castle

== Gallery ==
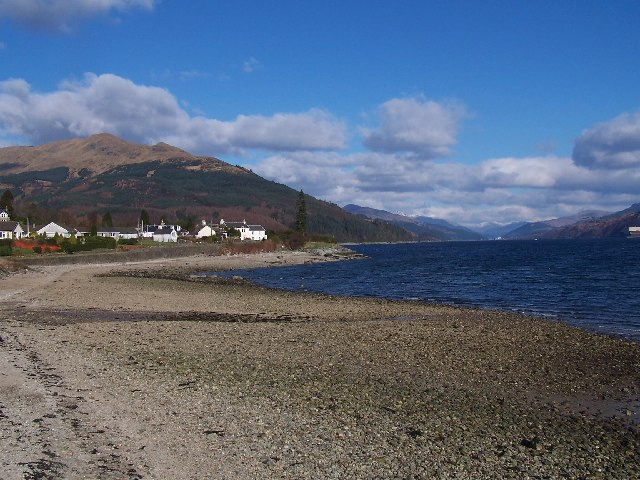
Loch Long shoreline at Ardentinny

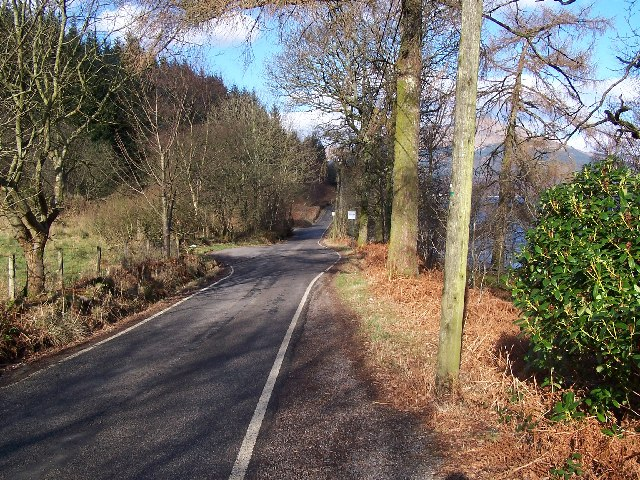
Road to Ardentinny from Blairmore

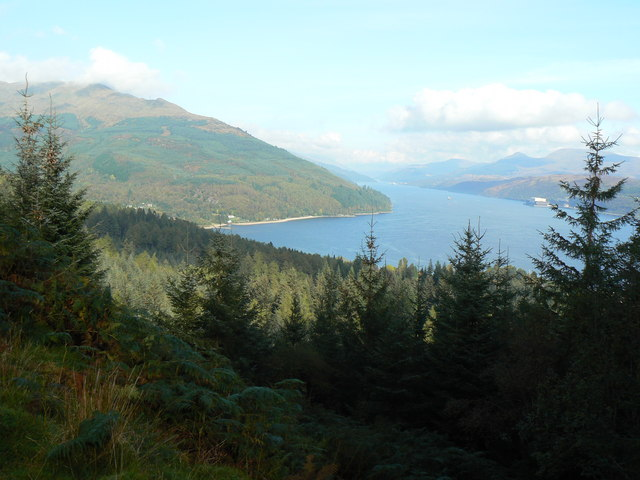
Loch Long from above Ardentinny
