= Victory Point (book) =

2009 book by Ed Darack on War in Afghanistan

Victory Point: Operations Red Wings and Whalers - The Marine Corps' Battle for Freedom in Afghanistan
- Cover of Victory Point
- Author: Ed Darack
- Language: English
- Subject: Operation Red Wings and Operation Whalers
- Genre: Nonfiction
- Publisher: Berkley Books, a Division of The Penguin Group
- Publication date: 2009 Hardcover, 2010 Paperback
- Publication place: United States
- Media type: Print (hardcover, paperback) and ebook
- Pages: 316 pg
- ISBN: 978-0-425-23259-0
- OCLC: 233549172
- LC Class: 2008047659

Victory Point: Operations Red Wings and Whalers - The Marine Corps' Battle for Freedom in Afghanistan is a nonfiction book by author Ed Darack published in hardcover in 2009 and in paperback in 2010 by The Berkley Publishing Group, an imprint of The Penguin Publishing Group. Victory Point comprehensively documents Operation Red Wings and Operation Whalers, two historically significant military operations that took place in the summer of 2005 in the Hindu Kush Mountains in Afghanistan's eastern Kunar Province.

Victory Point tells the comprehensive story of Operation Red Wings including regional history of Afghanistan's Kunar Province, specifically, the Korangal Valley and other areas of and around the Pech District of this eastern Afghanistan province. The book further provides background information about how Operation Red Wings evolved, including its purpose, and gives information on the leader of the target cell of the operation, Ahmad Shah, and how this information was uncovered. The book provides background on the command relationships among the various military entities involved in the operation, and discusses the ambush of the four Navy SEALs tasked as a reconnaissance and surveillance team for the opening of the operation. Victory Point further provides information on the shootdown of the U.S. Army Special Operations Command's 160th Special Operation's Aviation Regiment (Airborne) (SOAR(A)) MH-47 Special Operations Helicopter, which resulted in the deaths of 8 Navy SEALs and 8 Army Special Operations aviators, and the search for and recovery of Marcus Luttrell, the only survivor of the four-man Navy SEAL reconnaissance and surveillance team.

Victory Point narrates the development and execution of the sequel to Operation Red Wings, Operation Whalers. Operation Whalers resulted in the serious injury of Ahmad Shah and forced Shah and his men into Pakistan after a series of intense firefights in a high, steep, and treacherous valley. Victory Point illustrates the complexities and difficulties of this successful operation, one that relied not only on traditional Marine Corps infantry tactics, but modern combined arms coordination, with assets including Army Air Ambulance, U.S. Air Force attack aircraft, U.S. Army intelligence, U.S. Army artillery, and U.S. Air Force logistical support.

Author Ed Darack spent two months on the ground in Afghanistan with Marines in the region where Operation Red Wings and Operation Whalers took place for research for writing Victory Point.

Victory Point has been noted for its detail and comprehensiveness with regard to both Operation Red Wings as well as Operation Whalers. Victory Point has also been noted for its comprehensive overview of the region in which these operations took place. Victory Point has been cited in a number of books about the Afghan war. Victory Point was chosen as one of the best books of 2009 by the United States Naval Institute.
