= Travesty of Justice =

2019 book by Don Brown

Travesty of Justice: The Shocking Prosecution of Lt. Clint Lorance
- First edition
- Author: Don Brown
- Language: English
- Genre: Non-fiction
- Publisher: WildBlue Press
- Publication date: 2019
- Publication place: United States

Travesty of Justice: The Shocking Prosecution of Lt. Clint Lorance is a 2019 book of creative nonfiction written by Don Brown, about the United States Army’s prosecution of Lieutenant Clint Lorance. Lorance, a former paratrooper with the Army's 82nd Airborne Division, was convicted in 2013 for murder by an army court-martial for ordering Private E-2 David Shilo to fire on three Afghan men who had been riding a motorcycle toward their position in Kandahar Province, Afghanistan, in 2012. Lorance was sentenced to twenty years imprisonment. The book discusses what Brown contends are numerous efforts by Army prosecutors to coverup evidence of Lorance's innocence, including biometrics evidence that he argues links the motorcycle riders shot by Lorance's men to bombmaking that killed American troops in the Afghan War.

Brown, a former United States Navy JAG officer, and one of four former JAG officers serving on the Lorance defense team, appeared on Fox & Friends on April 13, 2019 with Pete Hegseth and Ed Henry to discuss the book, and to urge President Donald Trump to sign an order to disallow the findings and sentencing from Lorance's court-martial, to release him from prison and to return him to active duty in the Army. Between the release of Travesty of Justice on March 31, 2019 and Lorance's pardon on November 15, 2019, Brown made numerous national television appearances and penned numerous national OPEDs arguing that President Trump should free and exonerate Lieutenant Lorance. On November 15, 2019, Trump did in fact sign an Executive Grant of Clemency pardoning Lorance, and releasing him from prison. On the Wednesday night before Thanksgiving, November 27, 2019, Brown and Lorance appeared on Hannity, the nightly national broadcast on the Fox News Channel to discuss the presidential pardon and release.
