= Judge Advocate General's Corps =

Legal arm of each service branch of the U.S. Armed Forces

The Judge Advocate General's Corps (JAG or JAG Corps) is a military justice branch or specialty of the United States Air Force, Army, Coast Guard, Marine Corps, and Navy. Officers serving in a JAG Corps are typically called judge advocates.

Judge advocates are responsible for administrative law, government contracting, civilian and military personnel law, the law of war and international relations, environmental law, etc. They also serve as prosecutors for the military when conducting courts-martial.

== History ==
George Washington established the JAG Corps on July 29, 1775. Judge advocates were involved in writing and implementing Abraham Lincoln's General Orders No. 100: Instructions for the Government of the Armies of the United States in the Field, which was the first systematic code of the law of war in the United States.

== Duties and chain of command ==
Judge advocates serve primarily as legal advisors to the command to which they are assigned. In this function, they can also serve as the personal legal advisor to their commander. They are charged with both the defense and prosecution of military law as provided in the Uniform Code of Military Justice. Highly experienced officers of the JAG Corps often serve as military judges in courts-martial and courts of inquiry.

The services also have enlisted soldiers with specific paralegal training that provide support to judge advocates, although accession and scope of duty are also branch-specific. For example, the U.S. Army permits new recruits to become judge advocate enlisted, while the U.S. Navy does not. In addition to acting as paralegals to military attorneys, JAG enlisted often provide limited paralegal services such as drafting commonly used legal documents for service members and their families, providing guidance to unit commands regarding the administrative and disciplinary procedure, and acting as notaries.

The Marine Corps and Coast Guard do not maintain separate JAG Corps, and judge advocates in those services maintain their line-officer status. In the Navy, JAG officers only serve in legal positions. Judge advocates in the Army and Air Force retain eligibility for command and may be assigned to a non-legal position with permission of the Judge Advocate General, but this is only rarely done; the majority serve in legal positions and their careers are therefore similar to those of the Navy.

== Career path ==
According to the U.S. Department of Defense, judge advocates typically join the JAG Corps after graduating from law school. An exception is the U.S. Army's Funded Legal Education Program, under which a small number of active-duty officers and non-commissioned officers are selected to attend law school on a full-time basis tuition-free while receiving their military base pay and benefits. Other branches of the U.S. military offer similar programs.

== Military law ==
The Uniform Code of Military Justice, also known as UCMJ, is the primary legal code through which all internal military justice matters of the United States are governed. The UCMJ applies to all members of the military of the United States, including military retirees as well as members of other federal uniformed services (such as NOAA Corps and the Public Health Service Commissioned Corps) when attached to the military. The UCMJ was created by an act of the United States Congress in 1951 in order to establish relatively consistent systems of military justice in all branches of the nation's armed forces. However, in cases involving very minor disciplinary infractions, each service has somewhat differing procedures. Such cases are governed by UCMJ Article 15 and are called non-judicial punishment, Captain's Mast (Navy), or Office Hours (Marines).

In addition to the Uniform Code of Military Justice, personnel are subject to the terms of the Constitution, other federal laws, and individual state laws where applicable (e.g., whenever the service member is in the United States, unless on a military base with exclusive federal jurisdiction). When a violation of the UCMJ occurs, the matter is handled by the command of the service member. When a violation of a federal or state law occurs, the matter may be handled by local, state, or federal authorities.

== Court-martial ==
The forum through which criminal cases are tried in the United States armed forces is the court-martial. This term also applies to the panel of military officers selected to serve as the finders of fact or "jury". (In other words, they fulfill the role of a civilian jury in trying criminal cases.) The Uniform Code of Military Justice (UCMJ) outlines three distinct types of courts-martial.

=== General court-martial ===
- jurisdiction over crimes committed by any person, including civilians, covered by military law at the time the crime was committed
- forum for the most serious charges such as treason, espionage, homicide, sexual assault, drug distribution, or desertion
- officers detailed to the court are defense counsel, trial counsel (prosecutor), and military judge
- a court-martial panel (or "jury") comprises five or more service members, at least one-third of whom are enlisted if requested by an enlisted accused
- accused service member may request a trial by judge alone in lieu of trial by a panel of members, except where the death penalty may be adjudged
- maximum sentence that a general court-martial can impose is the maximum specified in the specific UCMJ Article (crime) the accused is convicted of, including death and/or a dishonorable discharge.

=== Special court-martial ===
- jurisdiction over crimes committed by any person, including civilians, covered by military law at the time the crime was committed
- forum for intermediate offenses such as the battery, assault, larceny (theft), minor drug-related offenses, unauthorized absence, disrespect, disobedience, and similar offences
- officers detailed to the court are defense counsel, trial counsel (prosecutor), and military judge
- special court-martial panel comprises three or more members, at least one-third of whom are enlisted if requested by an enlisted accused
- accused service member may request a trial by judge alone in lieu of trial by a panel of members
- regardless of what crime is charged at a Special Court-Martial, the maximum sentence that can be adjudged is 6 months' confinement, forfeiture of two-thirds pay for 6 months, reduction in rank, bad conduct discharge, and a fine
- a special court-martial cannot dismiss an officer

=== Summary court-martial ===
- jurisdiction over crimes committed by enlisted personnel only
- forum for minor offenses such as petty theft
- summary court-martial comprises a single officer whose pay grade should not be below O-3
- maximum sentence is one month's confinement, forfeiture of two-thirds pay, reduction in rank to E-1
- summary court-martial may not adjudge punishments of confinement without hard labor or reduction except the next inferior pay grade for accused who are in the pay grade of E-5 or greater
- can be refused by the accused, in which case the matter is normally referred to a special court-martial

== Appeals process ==
The Uniform Code of Military Justice provides for several tiers of appeal. All cases are reviewed by the commander convening the court (the convening authority) who, as a matter of command prerogative, may approve, disapprove, or modify the findings and/or sentence. The commander may not approve a finding of guilty for an offense of which the accused was acquitted nor increase the sentence adjudged. A convicted service member may submit a request for leniency to the convening authority prior to the convening authority's approval of the court-martial sentence.

Each military service and the Coast Guard has a Court of Criminal Appeals, which is composed of panels of three appellate military judges:

- Army Court of Criminal Appeals
- Navy-Marine Corps Court of Criminal Appeals
- Air Force Court of Criminal Appeals
- Coast Guard Court of Criminal Appeals

These courts review all cases in which the approved sentence includes death, a punitive discharge, or confinement for at least a year, and all cases referred to it by the service Judge Advocate General. The court of criminal appeals "may affirm only such findings of guilty and the sentence or such part of the sentence, as it finds correct in law and fact and determines, on the basis of the entire record, should be approved. In considering the record, it may weigh the evidence, judge the credibility of witnesses, and determine controverted questions of fact, recognizing that the trial court saw and heard the witnesses." Article 66(c), UCMJ.

The Court of Appeals for the Armed Forces (CAAF) consists of five civilian judges appointed by the President of the United States, with the advice and consent of the U.S. Senate, to 15-year terms. The CAAF must review cases from all of the military services in which the court of criminal appeals has affirmed a death sentence, cases the Judge Advocate General orders sent to the court, and cases appealed from the court of criminal appeals by the accused in which the CAAF finds good cause to grant the petition for review. Unlike the service courts of criminal appeals, the CAAF "shall take action only with respect to matters of law." Article 67(c), UCMJ. Decisions of the CAAF are "subject to review by the Supreme Court by writ of certiorari." Article 67a, UCMJ; this merely confirms Article III, Section 2 of the United States Constitution, granting the Supreme Court appellate jurisdiction in all US cases where it does not have original jurisdiction.

Cases not meeting the criteria for review by the service courts of criminal appeals are reviewed in the office of the service Judge Advocate General. Article 69, UCMJ. A death sentence "may not be executed until approved by the President. In such a case, the President may commute, remit, or suspend the sentence, or any part thereof, as he sees fit. That part of the sentence providing for death may not be suspended." Article 71(a), UCMJ.

== Other practice areas ==
Besides prosecuting, defending, and presiding over courts-martial, military attorneys advise commanders on issues involving a number of areas of law. Depending on the service, these areas may include the law of war, the rules of engagement and their interpretation, and other operational law issues, government contract law, administrative law, labor law, environmental law, international law, claims against the government (such as under the Federal Tort Claims Act), and information law (such as requests for information in the possession of the military under the Freedom of Information Act). Military attorneys also advise individual service members, military retirees, and their families regarding personal civil legal problems they may have, including drafting wills, fending off creditors and reviewing leases.

== Special training ==
In addition to being licensed attorneys in any state or territory of the U.S., all military attorneys undergo specialized training to qualify as judge advocates, allowing them to act as trial or defense counsel at military courts-martial. Specialized training takes place at one of three military law centers:

- The Judge Advocate General's Legal Center and School (U.S. Army) in Charlottesville, Virginia.
- Naval Justice School in Newport, Rhode Island.
- Air Force Judge Advocate General School at Maxwell Air Force Base, Montgomery, Alabama.

For example, newly commissioned Army JAG officers complete a 4-week Direct Commission Course (DCC) at Fort Sill, Oklahoma and then receive specialized legal training at an 11-week Judge Advocate Officer Basic Course at the TJAGLCS in Charlottesville. While the DCC course focuses on soldiering—fitness, land navigation, weapons—the JAOBC is about military-relevant law and taught in a law school environment. The course covers courts-martial and the Uniform Code of Military Justice (UCMJ), administrative investigations and separations, international and operational law, contracts and family law, as well as practical exercises for briefing commanders.

Naval Justice School is the primary training center for Navy, Marine, and Coast Guard JAs. Most judge advocates will take additional classes at more than one of these facilities during their time in the JAG Corps.

The Army's JAG School is the only military law center that has full American Bar Association accreditation. Its graduate course, leading to a Master of Laws degree, is open to judge advocates from all service branches.

== In popular culture ==
- JAG (TV series)
- Navy Justice Series, by Don Brown
- The Code
- A Few Good Men
- The Caine Mutiny

== See also ==
- United States Air Force Judge Advocate General's Corps
- United States Army Judge Advocate General's Corps
- United States Marine Corps Judge Advocate Division
- United States Navy Judge Advocate General's Corps
- United States Coast Guard Legal Division
- Judge-advocate
- Judge Advocate General
- Military justice
