= Extortion 17 shootdown =

Attack on a U.S. military helicopter in Tangi Valley, Maidan Wardak Province

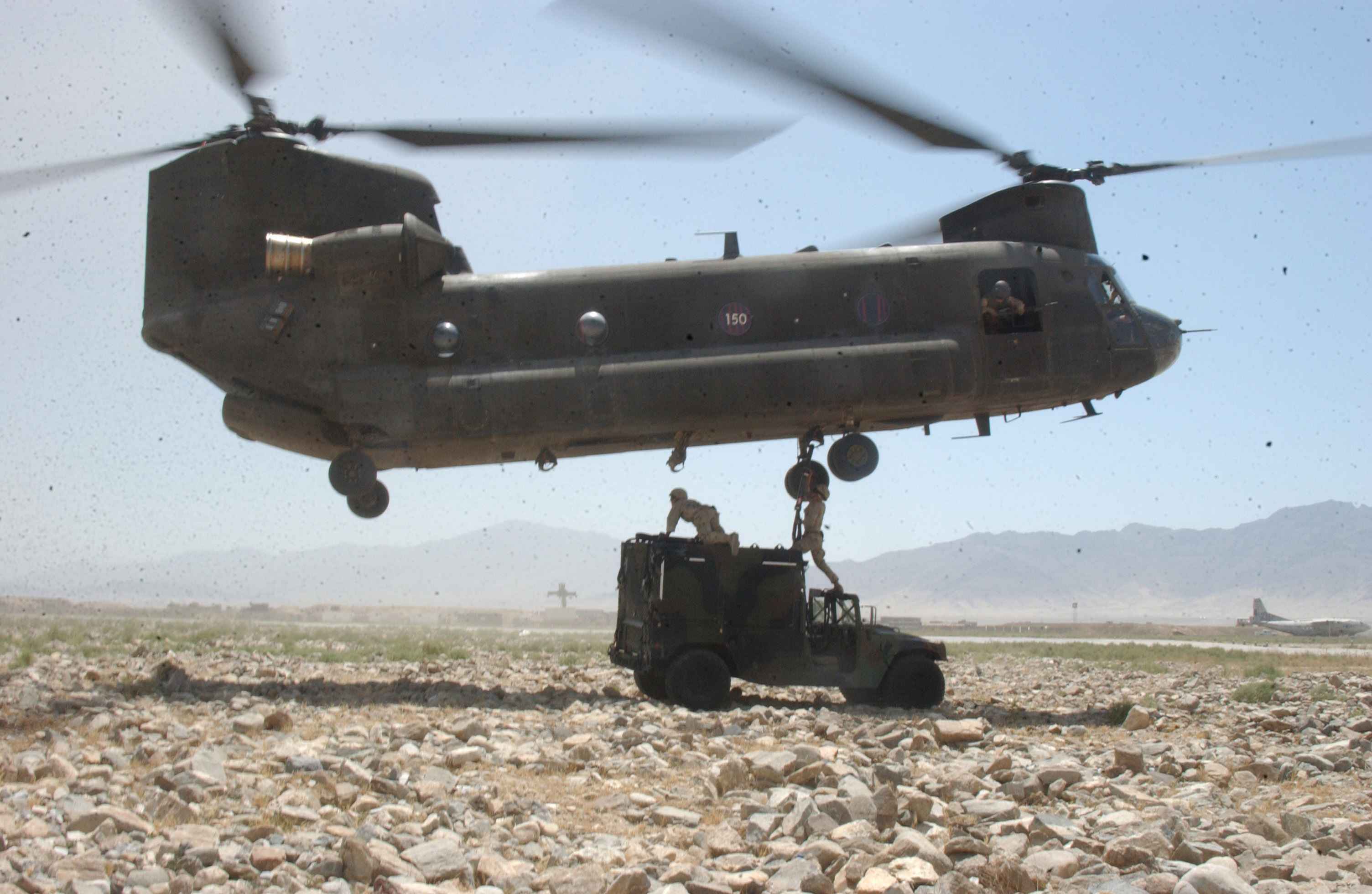
- A Boeing CH-47D Chinook helicopter in Bagram, Afghanistan, similar to the one that was shot down

Shootdown
- Date: 6 August 2011; 15 years ago
- Summary: Shot down by rocket-propelled grenade
- Site: Tangi Valley, Maidan Wardak Province, Afghanistan; 34°1′22.04″N 68°47′7.82″E

Aircraft
- Aircraft type: Boeing CH-47D Chinook
- Operator: United States Army
- Call sign: Extortion 17
- Registration: 84-24175
- Occupants: 38 + 1 service dog
- Passengers: 33
- Crew: 5
- Fatalities: 39
- Survivors: 0

On 6 August 2011, a U.S. CH-47D Chinook military helicopter operating with the call sign Extortion 17 (pronounced "Extortion one-seven") was shot down while transporting a Quick Reaction Force attempting to reinforce a Joint Special Operations Command unit of the 75th Ranger Regiment in the Tangi Valley in Maidan Wardak province, southwest of Kabul, Afghanistan.

The resulting crash killed all thirty-eight people and a military working dog on board including seventeen US Navy SEALs, two United States Air Force Pararescue from the 24th Special Tactics Squadron, one United States Air Force Combat Control Team member from the 24th Special Tactics Squadron, one pilot and two crewmen of the United States Army Reserve, one pilot and one crewman of the United States Army National Guard, seven members of the Afghan National Security Forces, and one Afghan interpreter. At 30 American military personnel killed, the shootdown of Extortion 17 represents the greatest single-incident loss of American lives in Operation Enduring Freedom – Afghanistan, surpassing the 16 lost in the downing of Turbine 33, a 160th Special Operations Aviation Regiment (Airborne) MH-47 helicopter, during Operation Red Wings on 28 June 2005.

== Background ==
In March 2009, the U.S. 10th Mountain Division established a base in Tangi Valley after increased Taliban activity in the area. American, French and Afghan National Police forces carried out a three-day sweep of the area, and the area was then deemed secure. In April 2011, American forces turned over control of Combat Outpost Tangi to Afghan government forces. However, the Afghan government forces did not occupy the base, which was seized by the Taliban shortly after the departure of American forces.

American forces continued to carry out operations in the area (mostly via helicopter and using special forces), encountering resistance from Taliban fighters on several occasions. For example, on 8 June 2011 another Chinook helicopter was engaged from five to six locations (i.e., points of origin) with 14 rocket-propelled grenades, forcing the crew to abort their mission.

== Timeline ==
After American intelligence services discovered in 2011 that senior Taliban leader Qari Tahir was possibly in Tangi Valley, Wardak province, Afghanistan, local American forces launched a mission to apprehend or kill him. At 22:37 (local time) on the night of 5 August, a platoon of 47 U.S. Army Rangers left a forward operating base in Logar Province via two CH-47D transport helicopters, one of which would later be involved in the accident. After a 20-minute flight (around 23:00), the two Chinook helicopters landed near the compound ostensibly containing Tahir, offloaded the Ranger platoon and returned to base.

The mission was deemed high risk; two AH-64 Apache helicopters, an AC-130 gunship, and other additional intelligence, surveillance and reconnaissance (ISR) aircraft supported the troop transports on their approach and remained with the ground forces afterwards. Seventeen U.S. Navy SEALs remained in reserve at the forward operating base.

As the Rangers approached the target compound, ISR aircraft observed several people leaving the compound. This group grew in number over the course of the night, but American forces were at first too preoccupied to engage. At 23:30, one of the Apache support helicopters engaged in a brief skirmish with a different group of eight Taliban fighters 400 m (440 yd) north of the compound, killing six.

Separately, ISR aircraft continued to observe the unengaged group from the compound. Originally just two people, the group eventually swelled to a total of nine or ten fighters, and the special operations task force commander and the Immediate Reaction Force commander became concerned that it might include Tahir. At 01:00, they decided to engage the group with the SEAL reserves.

Almost an hour later (01:50), the aviation brigade commander approved a new landing zone for infiltration of the SEAL team. The landing zone had been examined for a previous mission but had not yet been used.

At 02:00, the special operations task force commander and the Immediate Reaction Force commander decided to add additional (non-SEAL) reinforcements, increasing the size of the team to 33. In order to speed disembarkation, all troops were loaded on a single CH-47D helicopter for transport; the other Chinook would approach the landing zone second as a decoy. Around 02:23, the two helicopters departed the forward base.

Meanwhile, the group of Taliban fighters split in two. At 02:15, one group of three Taliban fighters took a position in a stand of trees; the remaining six or seven men entered a building located some 2 km (1.2 mi) from the target compound. Going forward, the two AH-64 Apache helicopters would be engaged in tracking those two groups of Taliban, and hence unable to provide surveillance or fire support to the inbound helicopter carrying the SEAL team.

Six minutes prior to reaching the landing zone, the empty CH-47D left the formation as planned. The helicopter carrying the SEALs proceeded to the landing zone alone, without external lighting. During the Ranger insertion earlier that night, the CH-47D had approached from the south; this time, it approached from the northwest. The helicopter made its last radio transmission stating that it was one minute away from the landing zone, then descended to an altitude of 100–150 ft (30–46 m) and slowed to a speed of 50 kn (58 mph; 93 km/h) as it approached the landing zone.

Around 02:38, the helicopter was fired upon and shot down by a previously undetected group of Taliban fighters approximately 220 m (240 yd) south of the helicopter. The group fired two or three RPG rounds from a two-story building, the second striking one of the helicopter's three aft rotor blades. The resulting explosion destroyed the aft rotor assembly. In less than five seconds, the helicopter crashed, killing all occupants, and approximately 30 seconds later, one of the AH-64 Apache helicopters radioed in the crash.

Six minutes later, the Rangers concluded securing the compound, detained several people and began to move on foot toward the crash site. They reached the site at 04:12 and found no survivors. Several minutes later, a 20-man Pathfinder team (specializing in downed-aircraft rescue and recovery) arrived at the site.

By 16:25, all of the remains were taken from the crash site via ground convoy and transported to Combat Outpost Sayyid Abad. Recovery of wreckage from the crash site lasted until 9 August 2011.

== Victims ==
Casualties from the event included:

- 15 United States Navy SEALs and one Military Working Dog handler from the Naval Special Warfare Development Group's Gold Squadron
- 2 U.S. Navy SEALs from Naval Special Warfare Group 1
- 4 U.S. Naval Special Warfare support personnel: Two Explosive ordnance disposal (EOD) technicians, one Cryptologic technician and one Information systems technician.
- 3 U.S. Army Reserve personnel (Aircrew) from the 7th Battalion, 158th Aviation Regiment
- 2 U.S. Army personnel (Aircrew) from the 2nd Battalion, 135th Aviation Regiment, part of the Colorado Army National Guard and Nebraska Army National Guard
- 2 U.S. Air Force Pararescuemen from the 24th Special Tactics Squadron
- 1 U.S. Air Force Combat Controller from the 24th Special Tactics Squadron
- 7 Afghan National Army Commandos, part of the Afghan National Army
- 1 Afghan civilian interpreter
- 1 U.S. Military Working Dog (Bart)

The 30 American deaths represent the greatest loss of U.S. military lives in a single incident in the war in Afghanistan that began in 2001.

Fifteen of the Navy SEALs that were killed were members of the Naval Special Warfare Development Group (DEVGRU), while the other two Navy SEALs were from an unidentified West Coast-based unit. The five other Navy casualties were NSW (Naval Special Warfare) support personnel; in addition to these, three AFSOC operators, one Combat Controller and two Pararescuemen, all members of the 24th Special Tactics Squadron, died in the crash. Their deaths are the greatest single loss of life ever suffered by the U.S. Special Operations community in the 37-year history of the U.S. Special Operations Command.

== Aftermath ==
In the afternoon of 6 August, a flash flood swept through the area, washing away parts of the wreckage.

Early media reports suggested that the Army had been tardy to recover flight recorders from the downed Chinook, and, as a consequence, the recorders had been swept away by the flood. These reports were erroneous; the CH-47D airframe does not contain flight recorders, although the MH-47 variant does have a flight data recorder and cockpit voice recorder.

Four years after the downing of Extortion 17, there were many theories about a possible government coverup. The official statement from U.S. Central Command stated that a Taliban fighter scored a lucky shot with a rocket-propelled grenade. It was reported that the Taliban fighters had no information of the helicopter's flight path and that they had been in the right place at the right time. A Department of Defense official asserted that there were no leaks from the Afghans. Doubts about this story were raised by families and other concerned citizens despite the fact that the Navy SEAL team aboard Extortion 17 was a different squadron than that which had killed Osama bin Laden three months earlier. The theories suggest that Afghan forces leaked information to the Taliban about the mission.

== Response ==
The U.S. military helicopter carrying special operations forces to a night-raid in the Tangi Valley of Wardak Province, was most likely brought down by a rocket-propelled grenade, according to military officials. Taliban spokesman Zabiullah Mujahid, confirmed that eight of the movement's fighters had been killed in the assault on the compound. He said: "They wanted to attack our Mujahideen who were in a house, but our Mujahideen resisted and destroyed a helicopter with a rocket-propelled grenade."

== Later accounts ==
Subsequent reports stated that on the night during which the helicopter had been delivering reinforcements to personnel of the 75th Ranger Regiment, another special operations unit engaged in a night raid on a compound to kill or capture a senior Taliban leader. During the battle, American forces observed a small group of Taliban trying to flee the scene. The group probably contained the commander and a few of his bodyguards, while the remaining Taliban fighters offered resistance in an effort to buy the group enough time to escape. In order to prevent this, American forces called in for support.

Other reports alleged that the Taliban had laid an elaborate trap for American special-operations forces, luring them in with false information. A senior Afghan government official, speaking anonymously, said that Taliban commander Qari Tahir had fed American forces false information about a meeting of insurgent leaders and fighters waited for the helicopter from both sides of a steep valley: "The Taliban knew which route the helicopter would take. That's the only route, so they took positions on either side of the valley on mountains and as the helicopter approached, they attacked it with rockets and other modern weapons. It was brought down by multiple shots."

== Reporting of event ==
=== Television ===
On 12 August 2011, Jim Lehrer of the PBS NewsHour announced that he would report the Honor Roll at the end of the program with names and photographs of all 30 men. He said, "And now, to our honor roll of American Service Personnel killed in the Iraq and Afghanistan conflicts. Yesterday, the Pentagon released the names of the 30 troops-- Navy SEALs, soldiers, and airmen, killed in the helicopter downed by Taliban fighters in eastern Afghanistan last weekend. Here, in silence, are the names and photographs of all 30 men." NBC News reported that the Pentagon released the names of the 30 Americans killed.

=== Newspapers ===
The New York Post reported that the Pentagon released 30 names from the crash. Kevin Sieff and Greg Jaffe of The Washington Post reported that U.S. officials confirmed the deaths, including 22 SEALs. The Seattle Times and The New York Times also reported this information.

== Subsequent events ==
After the shootdown of Extortion 17, the insurgent responsible used a two-way radio to brag to others about the act. American signals intelligence aircraft intercepted these transmissions and subsequently tracked the individual and his accomplice. American intelligence officials identified this individual as "OBJECTIVE GINOSA." On the night of 8 August 2011, an F-16 dropped four GBU-54 "Laser JDAM" bombs on the man, his accomplice and four associates in the Chak Valley, which lies to the west of the Tangi Valley. Monitored and controlled by a Joint Terminal Attack Controller at Forward Operating Base Shank via a General Atomics MQ-1 Predator unmanned aerial vehicle, all six were positively confirmed killed by the bomb strike and subsequent attacks by a Lockheed AC-130 gunship and two Boeing AH-64 Apache helicopter gunships.

On 10 August 2011, the U.S. military stated that the insurgent who fired the rocket-propelled grenade had been killed only two days afterward in an F-16 airstrike, saying only that intelligence gained on the ground provided "a high degree of confidence" that the person was among those killed in the airstrike from two days earlier, but providing no other details.

During the same Pentagon news conference in which he announced that the F-16 airstrike had incapacitated "less than 10" of the insurgents involved, International Security Assistance Force (ISAF) commander in Afghanistan John R. Allen said that the military investigation would also review whether small-arms fire or other causes might have contributed to the downing.

Following the withdrawal of U.S. forces in April 2011, Tangi valley became a major staging area for attacks on Kabul (located just 60 miles away). Tangi valley remained under Taliban control until April 2013, when more than 1,000 Afghan security forces personnel launched an offensive in an effort to clear the area of Taliban fighters.

In October 2011, U.S. Central Command (CENTCOM) announced that an investigation following the shootdown concluded "that all operational decisions, linked to the incident, were deemed tactically sound." The article stated that the helicopter crashed after an RPG round impacted the aft rotor assembly.

In 2013, Congressman Jason Chaffetz said that he would hold an investigation of the United States House Oversight Subcommittee on National Security into the matter. At the subsequent hearing in February 2014, Pentagon representative Garry Reid defended the decision to undertake the mission and denied that the Taliban had any advance knowledge of it. He said that insurgents had assumed a strong tactical position without knowledge of the helicopter's flight path.

In 2017, Air Force captain Joni Marquez, the fire control officer on an AC-130 gunship that had accompanied Extortion 17 on the final flight, made a similar claim. Ranger assault helicopters had already engaged the enemy and killed six of eight Taliban fighters, causing the other two to retreat. In her first interview about the incident, Marquez said: "I had the sensor operators immediately shift to the eight insurgents the helicopters had taken out. Two were still alive." Captain Marquez claims that had the AC-130 been allowed to fire on the remaining enemy insurgents, Extortion 17 would not have been shot down. Warnings from her crew to turn the Chinook back or cancel their mission went unheeded.

American rules of engagement were tightened by Gen. Stanley McChrystal in 2009 in order to improve American counterinsurgency strategy. McChrystal cited a previous "overreliance on firepower and force protection" and the need to reduce civilian casualties and win the cooperation of the local population.

== See also ==
- Call Sign Extortion 17: The Shoot-Down of SEAL Team Six, book by Don Brown (2015)
- The Final Mission of Extortion 17, a book on the incident by Ed Darack
- 1994 Black Hawk shootdown incident
- List of aviation accidents and incidents in the war in Afghanistan
- List of fatal helicopter crashes
