= Robert Meldrum Craig =

Dr Robert Meldrum Craig FRSE FGS (13 July 1882 – 28 March 1956) was a prominent Scottish geologist and academic author. He left a large collection of fossils now housed in the collection of the University of St Andrews.

== Life ==
He was born on 13 July 1882 in Ardentinny in Argyllshire in northern Scotland, the son of Rev Robert Craig, the local minister. His younger brother John Douglas Craig grew to fame as a classicist. He was schooled at the local parish school and then attended Madras College in the University of St Andrews. James Manson Craig, Professor of English at the University of St Andrews was also his brother. Several other brothers grew to fame in the military: Brigade Major Henry David Cook Craig MC; Lt Falconer Gray Craig MC; Cpt Archibald Douglas Craig. Joseph Murison Craig became a surgeon, and his sister Constance Craig became a missionary in China.

In 1909 he began lecturing in Geology at Dundee, then a branch of the University of St Andrews, moving to St Andrews in 1912.

In the First World War he served first in the Durham Light Infantry then in the 5th South Staffordshire Regiment (rising to the rank of Captain). From 1918 to 1921 he acted as the Government Geologist to Nyasaland in Africa. He then received a professorship at the University of Edinburgh and remained there from 1921 until retiral, lecturing in economic geology. In 1931 he gained a DSc, on the geology of Harris and Lewis, from the University. He was elected a Fellow of the Royal Society of Edinburgh in 1925. His proposers were Thomas James Jehu, John Horne, Ben Peach, and Robert Campbell. He won the Society’s Keith Medal for 1925-27.

He served as a President of the Edinburgh Geological Society 1934-6 and Trustee from 1939 to 1948.

He died on 28 March 1956.

== Publications ==
See

- Structural and Field Geology
- Outline of the Geology of Prince Charles Foreland
- Geology and Scenery of the Hebrides
- Geology of the Outer Hebrides: Barra (co-written with Thomas James Jehu)
