= Call Sign Extortion 17 =

2015 book by Don Brown

Call Sign Extortion 17: The Shoot-Down of SEAL Team Six
- First edition
- Author: Don Brown
- Language: English
- Genre: War; Historical non-fiction
- Publication place: United States
- Pages: viii, 295 pages
- ISBN: 9781493007462

Call Sign Extortion 17: The Shoot-Down of SEAL Team Six is a 2015 non-fiction expose, written by best-selling author and former U.S. Navy JAG Officer Don Brown, about the 2011 Chinook shootdown in Afghanistan of a United States Boeing CH-47 Chinook helicopter. It is published by Rowman & Littlefield Publishing Group, through its Imprint, Lyons Press. In the shoot-down, 31 Americans lost their lives, including 17 U.S. Navy SEALs, 15 of whom were from 2 troop, Gold Squadron at SEAL Team Six, officially the United States Naval Special Warfare Development Group.

The crash, said to have been caused by a rocket-propelled grenade fired by Taliban forces in the Tangi Valley of Wardak Province, when the helicopter was at approximately 100–150 feet off the ground just before landing, was the largest loss-of-life by U.S. in the Afghan War. The Chinook was shot down in the early morning hours of August 6, 2011, at approximately 0239 AM local time, and was the largest single loss of American life in the history of the U.S. Navy SEALs.

The book is written based largely upon a review of the official, non-classified military record of the crash, which was mysteriously leaked to several family members in October 2011, one month after the official military investigation was closed. Brown claims that the SEAL team may have been sacrificed, either through extreme gross negligence in the mission-planning or for other reasons, and has stated in interviews that the military is covering up key facts germane to the case, including the identities of seven Afghans who slipped onto the helicopter without authority, and the true status of the helicopter's black box, which has been the subject of conflicting reports by the military.

Brown criticizes the U.S. rules of engagement, which prevented pre-landing suppression fire into the helicopter's designated landing zone, and which, according to Brown, allowed Taliban forces to slip into the area of the landing zone and fire the RPG which destroyed the helicopter. Pre-suppression fire would have cleared the landing zone and saved the lives of the Americans, Brown argues repeatedly. Brown also claims the military committed a major security breach, by allowing seven unidentified Afghan commandos to board the helicopter just before takeoff, and subsequently attempting to cover up the breach in the final report, and suggesting the possibility of an "inside job" by the Taliban.

On the subject of the seven unidentified Afghans, whose bodies were inexplicably flown to the United States and possibly cremated, the Washington Times quotes Brown as saying, "Something went terribly wrong inside that helicopter, and whatever went wrong was most likely beyond the pilots' control", he says. "It's as if the unidentified Afghan infiltrators were the big pink elephant in the room that no one wants to talk about." Brown raises concerns that the unidentified Afghans could have been involved in sabotaging the flight internally, and raises concerns about the military's inability to find the helicopter's black box, and then its shifting position, nearly three years after the shoot-down, that there was no black box.

Brown deems the Pentagon's shifting position on the black box not to be credible, and has pointed out that a team of US Army Pathfinders was sent to the crash site to look for the black box. He criticizes the Congressional subcommittee investigating the crash for not questioning why US Army Rangers were sent to search for a black box if there were no black box to begin with.

He also criticizes the official military report for claiming that U.S. Army Rangers were the first units on the ground after the crash, at 412 AM, but omitting other evidence that two other unidentified units were on the ground before the Rangers, one as early as 304 AM.

He also argues that the Taliban was tipped as to the exact landing zone, and was waiting with RPGs, and fired a point-blank shot at the chopper upon final approach. He is critical of both the military's official investigation for not investigating British press reports that the Taliban was tipped off, and the Congressional subcommittee which held a hearing on the matter in February 2014, in the book, and in interviews with both Tom Trento and David Chadwick,

Brown claims that a U.S. AC-130 gunship, circling above the Chinook at the time of the shootdown, spotted suspected Taliban insurgents moving on the ground towards the Chinook's landing zone, and requested permission to attack and eliminate the suspected Taliban insurgents. However, Brown claims that the gunship was denied permission to attack the insurgents by U.S. military authorities, and moments later, the helicopter was shot down. Brown argues that had either the AC-130 or two Apache attack helicopters accompanying the Chinook been allowed to clear the landing zone with suppression fire, that RPG-bearing Taliban insurgents would have been eliminated, allowing the chopper to land safely.

In his book, Brown makes the charge that foolish rules of engagement effectively sealed the doom of the SEAL team and the other Americans on board Extortion 17.

On April 18, 2017, Brown's claims on the rule-of-engagement were apparently corroborated when Air Force Captain Joni Marquez, who was the firing officer on an AC-130 gunship which accompanied Extortion 17 on the final flight, claimed that the gunship was denied permission to engage Taliban on the ground. Captain Marquez contends that had the AC-130 been allowed to fire on enemy insurgents on the ground, that Extortion 17 would not have been shot down.
