= Victory point =

Victory point may refer to:

- Victory point, a board game mechanic, points tallied as a victory condition
- Victory point, a contract bridge term, a conversion scale used to reduce the effect of very large swings
- Victory Point, a geographical location on King William Island in the Canadian arctic
  - Victory Point note, a note related to Franklin's lost expedition, named after Victory Point where it was first placed
- Victory Point (book), a 2009 nonfiction book by Ed Darack

== See also ==
- Victory
