= Ed Darack =

American author and photographer

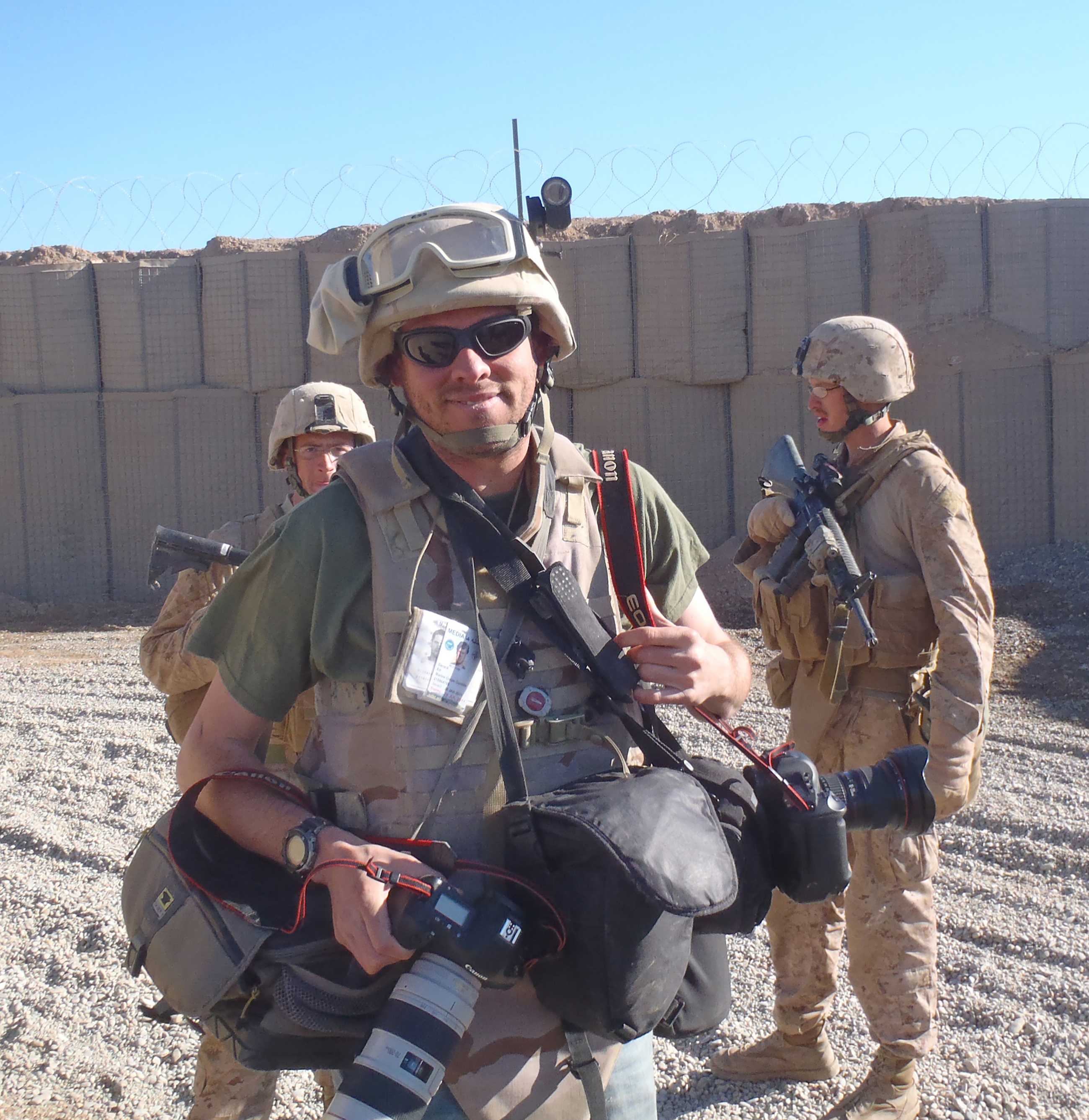
- Education: University of California, Davis Victory Point
- Occupations: Author and Photographer
- Writing career
- Language: English
- Website: www.darack.com

Signature
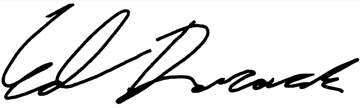

Ed Darack is an American author and photographer. He is the author of The Final Mission of Extortion 17, about the August 6, 2011 downing of Extortion 17, Victory Point: Operations Red Wings and Whalers – The Marine Corps' Battle for Freedom in Afghanistan, about Operation Red Wings and Operation Whalers, two American military operations that took place in 2005 in eastern Afghanistan's Kunar Province. He is the author of three other books in addition to Victory Point, including 6194: Denali Solo and Wind - Water - Sun: A Solo Kayak Journey Along Baja California's Desert Coastline. Darack is also an author of magazine articles about a range of subjects, a photographer published in media throughout the world, and a cartographer.

== Books ==
=== Victory Point ===
Victory Point: Operations Red Wings and Whalers – The Marine Corps' Battle for Freedom in Afghanistan is a nonfiction contemporary military history work published in 2009 in hardcover and as an E-book, and then in paperback in 2010 by The Berkley Publishing Group, an imprint of The Penguin Publishing Group. Victory Point documents Operation Red Wings and Operation Whalers, two American military operations that took place in the summer of 2005 in the Hindu Kush Mountains in Afghanistan's eastern Kunar Province. Darack spent two months on the ground in Afghanistan with U.S. Marines for the book's field research. The book was noted for its detail and was chosen as one of the best books of 2009 by the United States Naval Institute. Victory Point was endorsed by Bing West, former Assistant Secretary of Defense for International Security Affairs for the Reagan Administration, US Army Major (Ret.) Thomas Greer, former Delta Force commander and New York Times Best Selling author who uses the pen name Dalton Fury, and others.

Victory Point, in conjunction with Darack's article entitled "Operation Red Wings: What Really Happened?" (Published in print on page 62 of the January, 2011 issue of the Marine Corps Gazette (available here)) has been referenced and cited by a number of media outlets, journalists, and authors regarding the accuracy of various portrayals of Operation Red Wings including by New York Times best-selling author and Pulitzer Prize–winning journalist Thomas E. Ricks in Foreign Policy, Jake Tapper on CNN, Slate Magazine, About.com, 60 Minutes, and others.

=== Wild Winds ===
Wild Winds: Adventures in the Highest Andes, an adventure travel narrative, chronicles Darack's ascents of and travels throughout the highest peaks of the Andes of South America through narrative, photographs, and maps. Ascents include those of Aconcagua, the highest mountain in South America, Argentina, the Western Hemisphere, and the Southern Hemisphere (and one of the Seven Summits), Ojos del Salado, the world's highest volcano and highest mountain in Chile, Nevado Sajama, the highest mountain in Bolivia, and also Monte Pissis and Llullaillaco. Published by AlpenBooks on November 1, 2001, Wild Winds was cited by The New York Times on the subject of the "Death Zone."

=== Wind - Water - Sun ===
Wind - Water - Sun: A Solo Kayak Journey Along Baja California's Desert Coastline, an adventure travel narrative published by Poudre Canyon Press in December 1998, recounts Darack's two-month, 850 mile solo sea kayaking / photography expedition along the Sea of Cortez coastline of the Baja California Peninsula from near the small village of El Golfo de Santa Clara of northern Sonora, Mexico on the Colorado River Delta, to the Cape region of southern Baja California Sur. The book includes text, over 100 of Darack's color photographs of the coastline, and a 16-map full-color atlas of the coastline at a scale of 1:500,000 created by Darack.

=== 6194: Denali Solo ===
6194: Denali Solo, an adventure travel narrative self-published by Darack in March, 1995, covers his two attempts (one unsuccessful and one successful) to solo-climb Denali, the highest mountain in North America and one of the Seven Summits. Darack succeeded in climbing Denali, via the West Buttress route, on June 29, 1991 when he was 20 years old, possibly the youngest to make a solo ascent of the mountain. 6194, endorsed by Galen Rowell, was nominated for the Boardman Tasker Prize for Mountain Literature in 1995.

== Magazine article works ==
Darack has written articles for a number of different magazines, including Air & Space / Smithsonian, Weatherwise Magazine (for which he is a contributing editor), Alpinist Magazine, Leatherneck Magazine, The Marine Corps Gazette, Proceedings of the United States Naval Institute, Climbing Magazine, Rock & Ice Magazine, Nature Photographer Magazine, Alaska Geographic, Sea Kayaker Magazine, and others. Topics about which he writes include military, science, weather, travel, geography, mountaineering, adventure, and aviation, among others. Darack's articles have been referenced and discussed by a range of media throughout the world, including Stern, The Daily Telegraph, Yahoo News, and others.

== Photography ==
Ed Darack is a stock and magazine photographer. Darack's photographs cover a range of topics, including military, travel, landscape, nature, aerial, aviation, science, weather, adventure travel, and others. Darack's photographs have been published in a range of media types throughout the world. His photography publishing credits include Smithsonian, Air & Space/Smithsonian, Vanity Fair, The New York Times, The Daily Telegraph, Scholastic, Random House, Weather Channel, The BBC, Time, The National Geographic Society, Bank of America, Forbes, and numerous others. Darack's photographs have appeared on the covers of a number of magazines, organizational publications, and books, including:

- The hardcover version of the book Where Men Win Glory: The Odyssey of Pat Tillman by Jon Krakauer featured Darack's photograph of a silhouette of an Afghan fighter at dawn on its cover. Published by Random House, Where Men Win Glory peaked at number 2 on The New York Times Best Seller List on the week of October 4, 2009. Darack's image was also used on a number of foreign versions of Where Men Win Glory, including those published in the United Kingdom, Germany, and Italy.
- Darack's image of Cerro Torre was used on the cover of Italian mountaineer, explorer, and author Reinhold Messner's book, Grido Di Pietra, published by the Italian publisher Corbaccio in 2009.
- Darack's image, "Snow Covered Mountain Range, Sunset, Elevated View, Canada" featuring King Peak was used as the centerpiece of Canada Post's stamp commemorating the Canadian Rangers. Released on March 3, 2003, the stamp had a print run of 3,000,000.

== Cartography ==
Darack is a cartographer who has published over one hundred maps, including a full-color, highly detailed atlas of Baja California's Sea of Cortez coastline, comprising 16 individual 1:500,000 scale maps. Other maps of his of note include those of South America and individual Andean peaks including Aconcagua.

== Patents ==
Darack has been issued a number of United States Patents from the United States Patent and Trademark Office, primarily for aircraft design.

== Television ==
Darack appeared on the National Geographic / Smithsonian television documentary Titanic: Case Closed, where he explained and discussed mirages and shot photographs of them in the California desert.
