= The Final Mission of Extortion 17 =

2017 book by Ed Darack

The Final Mission of Extortion 17: Special Ops, Helicopter Support, SEAL Team Six, And The Deadliest Day Of The U.S. War in Afghanistan
- First edition
- Author: Ed Darack
- Language: English
- Subject: Extortion 17
- Publisher: Smithsonian Books
- Publication date: 2017 Hardcover, ebook, and audiobook
- Publication place: United States
- Media type: Print (hardcover), ebook, and audiobook
- Pages: 240 pg
- ISBN: 978-1-58834-589-9

The Final Mission of Extortion 17: Special Ops, Helicopter Support, SEAL Team Six, And The Deadliest Day of The U.S. War in Afghanistan is a book by Ed Darack. It was published on September 19, 2017. It describes the downing of Extortion 17, a U.S. Army CH-47D Chinook helicopter, in the Tangi Valley of Afghanistan's Maidan Wardak Province in the early hours of 6 August 2011. The book focuses on the helicopter's two pilots and three crew members.

== Synopsis and development ==
The book grew out of Darack's work on his 2015 Air & Space/Smithsonian article, "The Final Flight of Extortion 17". The book examines the event, relying on interviews of people close to events and provides the first complete, accurate accounting of the downing.

Darack interviewed approximately 60 people for the book, including experts in specific areas related to the story. The book provides in-depth analysis on all aspects of the helicopter's downing, including technical details, historical background and information on crew and passengers. Some family members of those killed on Extortion 17 supported Darack's efforts by allowing him to interview them.

According to a May 26, 2017 review in Library Journal, the book effectively rules out conspiracy theories.

== Publication ==
The hardcover and ebook is published by Smithsonian Books with distribution by Penguin Random House. The audiobook is published by Blackstone Audio.

== Reception ==
The book received mostly positive reviews from critics. Publishers Weekly called it "Short, clear, and tersely written [...] a fitting tribute to the Army aviators represented by the crew of Extortion 17." Raymond Leach of The Virginian-Pilot praised the book, saying that it was "written with the perspective of time, exhaustive research and a detailed, respectful homage to the dedicated aircrew who flew that mission."
