= William H. Rupertus =

United States Marine Corps general (1889–1945)

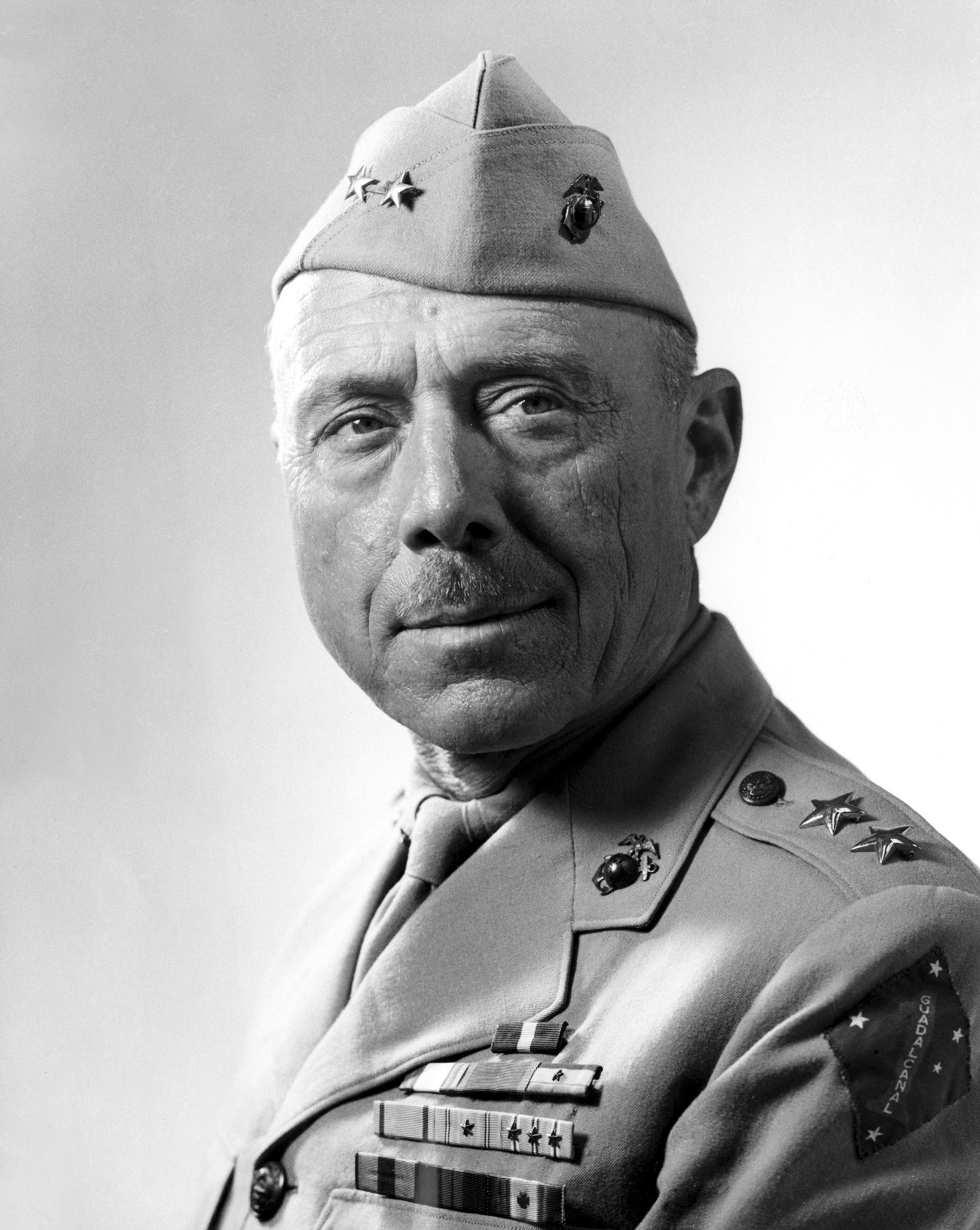
- MajGen William H. Rupertus, author of the "Rifleman's Creed"
- Born: November 14, 1889; Washington, D.C., US
- Died: March 25, 1945 (aged 55); Quantico, Virginia, US
- Relatives: Capt. Patrick Hill Rupertus USMC (son)
- Military career
- Allegiance: United States
- Branch: District of Columbia National Guard; United States Marine Corps
- Service years: 1907–1910 (National Guard); 1913–1945 (USMC)
- Rank: Major general
- Unit: 4th Marine Regiment
- Commands: 1st Marine Division
- Conflicts: World War I; Banana Wars; Occupation of Haiti; Chinese Civil War; World War II; Second Sino-Japanese War; Battle of Shanghai; Guadalcanal campaign; Battle of Tulagi and Gavutu-Tanambogo; Operation Cartwheel; New Britain campaign; Battle of Cape Gloucester; Mariana and Palau Islands campaign; Battle of Peleliu
- Awards: Navy Cross; Navy Distinguished Service Medal; Army Distinguished Service Medal

William Henry Rupertus (November 14, 1889 – March 25, 1945) was a major general in the United States Marine Corps, who commanded the famed 1st Marine Division in the Pacific in World War II and also authored the USMC Rifleman's Creed.

== Personal life ==
Rupertus was married to Marguerite L. Gorman, daughter of Terrence and Hannah Keleher Gorman, on December 24, 1913. On February 25, 1930, Rupertus' wife, Marguerite, and 11-year-old son, William Jr., both died of scarlet fever. Rupertus died of a heart attack on March 25, 1945, just four months after taking command at Quantico. He is buried with his family in Arlington National Cemetery.

== Military career ==
Rupertus began his military career immediately after graduating high school, serving in the District of Columbia National Guard from 1907 to 1910. Originally, he intended to serve as a cutter captain in the United States Revenue Cutter Service, the earlier version of the modern U.S. Coast Guard. He was accepted to the U.S. Revenue Cutter School of Instruction on April 28, 1910. He graduated academically second in his class on May 15, 1913, but failed the physical examination. Because he was physically unqualified, he resigned from the U.S. Revenue Cutter Service on June 18, 1913.

However, his excellent marksmanship led to his being recruited by the Marine Corps. He accepted a commission in November 1913, then attended the Marine Corps Officers School, graduating first in his class of 1915. Rupertus served on the Marine Corps rifle team, earning the Distinguished Marksman badge and winning a number of shooting matches.

Rupertus was serving aboard the battleship USS Florida when the United States entered World War I and was subsequently recalled up to the U.S. to command a detachment of Marines headed for Port-au-Prince, Haiti. Rupertus served in Haiti for three years until after the war, when he was sent to staff officer training and then made Inspector of Target Practice in the Operations and Training Division at Marine Corps Headquarters. In 1929 he commanded a detachment of the 4th Marines in Peking, China.

In July 1937, Rupertus was a battalion commander in the 4th Marines when the Japanese attacked Shanghai in the Second Sino-Japanese War.

Then-Lt. Col. Rupertus (bottom left) at a party in Shanghai in 1937.

During World War II, as commanding officer of the Marine barracks at San Diego, he wrote the Marine Corps Rifleman's Creed right after Pearl Harbor was bombed. He penned the Rifleman's Creed with the intent of encouraging expert marksmanship and Marines' trust in their weapons. In March 1942, he served as assistant division commander of the 1st Marine Division under Major General Alexander Vandegrift in New River, North Carolina to assist in the formation and training of the First Marine Division.

Rupertus commanded the Landing Task Force Organization which captured the islands of Tulagi, Gavutu and Tanambogo in the Guadalcanal campaign. After Vandegrift left the division in 1943, Rupertus took command. He led the 1st Marine Division during the Battle of Cape Gloucester and the Battle of Peleliu.

His leadership in the latter was severely criticized, both within the Marine Corps and publicly. In the US, it was a controversial battle because of the island's negligible strategic value and the high casualty rate, which exceeded that of all other amphibious operations during the Pacific War. The National Museum of the Marine Corps called it "the bitterest battle of the war for the Marines".

In November 1944, Major General Rupertus became the commandant of the Marine Corps Schools at Quantico, Virginia.

== Awards and honors ==
Major General Rupertus' decorations included:

Navy Cross
Navy Distinguished Service Medal	Army Distinguished Service Medal	Navy Presidential Unit Citation w/ 2 service stars
Marine Corps Expeditionary Medal w/ 1 service star	World War I Victory Medal with Maltese cross	Haitian Campaign Medal (1921)
China Service Medal	American Defense Service Medal w/ "BASE" clasp	American Campaign Medal
Asiatic-Pacific Campaign Medal w/ 4 service stars	World War II Victory Medal	Haitian Distinguished Service Medal

In 1945, the U.S. Navy destroyer USS Rupertus (DD-851) was named in his honor.

Rupertus also received the Faciat Georgius commemorative medal for service on Guadalcanal.

=== Navy Cross citation ===
Citation:

The President of the United States of America takes pleasure in presenting the Navy Cross to Brigadier General William H. Rupertus (MCSN: 0-852), United States Marine Corps, for extraordinary heroism and distinguished service as Commander of a Landing Force Task Organization composed of the FIRST Raider Battalion, the Second Battalion, FIFTH Marines, and the FIRST Parachute Battalion, in action against enemy Japanese forces during the attack on the Solomon Islands, 7 to 9 August 1942. Despite the comparatively short time afforded him in which to organize his command, Brigadier General Rupertus quickly and efficiently assembled a provisional staff, and with their aid, his forces landed on Tulagi, Gavutu and Tanambogo, British Solomon Islands, and successfully assaulted a series of strategically disposed and strongly defended enemy positions. Personally conducting the operation and dauntlessly exposing himself to enemy fire whenever necessary, he displayed exceptional courage and cool determination which served as an inspiration to the officers and men of his command. His bold and judicious decisions and his high professional attainments contributed effectively to the success of our operations in the Tulagi Area and his conduct throughout was in keeping with the highest traditions of the United States Naval Service.

== Books on General Rupertus ==
Old Breed General, co-authored by Don Brown, author of multiple books on the U.S. Military and Amy Rupertus Peacock, who is General Rupertus's granddaughter, published in 2022 by Rowman & Littlefield through Stackpole Books.

== Notes ==
=== References ===
- "Major General William H. Rupertus, USMC". Who's Who in Marine Corps History. History Division, United States Marine Corps. Archived from the original on 2011-05-16.
- "Rupertus". Dictionary of American Naval Fighting Ships. Naval Historical Center, Department of the Navy. October 21, 2005. Archived from the original on 2007-02-09.

Military offices
Preceded by Alexander Vandegrift	Commanding General of the 1st Marine Division; 8 July 1943 – 2 November 1944	Succeeded by Pedro del Valle
