= John Craig (classicist) =

Scottish classical scholar (1887–1968)

John Douglas Craig
- Born: 31 May 1887
- Died: 13 May 1968 (aged 80)
- Occupation: Professor of Latin at the University of Sheffield

John Douglas Craig (31 May 1887 – 13 May 1968) was a Scottish classicist, who was Firth Professor of Latin at the University of Sheffield from 1930 to 1952.

== Life ==
Craig was the son of Rev Robert Craig, minister in Ardentinny in Argyll, Scotland. He was the younger brother of Robert Meldrum Craig FRSE, the geologist, and Prof James Manson Craig of St Andrews University.

He was educated at Madras College, St Andrews, and then studied classics at the University of St Andrews under Wallace Lindsay and John Burnet, before moving to Jesus College, Oxford for further studies. He obtained a first-class degree in classics at St Andrews, and a second-class degree in Literae Humaniores at Oxford.

He then assisted Lindsay in St Andrews from 1912 to 1913 before becoming Assistant Professor of Classics at Queen's University, in Kingston, Ontario, Canada in 1913. In 1915, he left Canada to be commissioned in the Royal Artillery and was severely wounded in action at the Battle of the Somme. He returned to Ontario in 1919 as Acting Professor of Latin, moving to the University of Sheffield as Lecturer in Classics in 1920, and back to St Andrews in 1924 as Lecturer in Humanity. During this time, he undertook a lot of the teaching and administrative work that Lindsay was unable to due because of increasing deafness.

Craig returned to Sheffield as Firth Professor of Latin in 1930, building up good relations with the classics department at the nearby University of Leeds, before retiring to live in St Andrews in 1952. He became a town councillor in his efforts to preserve St Andrews from change, a task in which he was not always successful and sometimes aroused opposition. His main scholarship was on the Roman author Terence, but his teaching work was also highly regarded.
