= George Gardner (botanist) =

British scientist (1812–1849)

George Gardner (1810, Ardentinny – 1849, Kandy) was a Scottish biologist mainly interested in botany.

Gardner's father was a gardener first to the Earl of Dunmore in Ardentinny, then from 1816 to the Earl of Eglinton at Ardrossan. In 1822, his parents moved to Glasgow where he attended the grammar-school and acquired a good knowledge of the Latin language. He began the study of medicine in the Andersonian university of Glasgow in 1829, eventually becoming a surgeon.

In 1836, encouraged by the famed botanist William Jackson Hooker, he brought out an exsiccata work entitled Musci Britannici, or Pocket Herbarium of British Mosses arranged and named according to Hooker’s "British Flora". His botanical work impressed John Russell, 6th Duke of Bedford who became his patron. In the summer of 1836 Gardner sailed from Liverpool for Rio de Janeiro, to collect natural history specimens in North Brazil, including plants, minerals, recent and fossil shells, preserved skins of birds, mammals and fishes. The specimens were sent to public botanic gardens, as well as to private subscribers to the expedition. He stayed in Brazil for years (1836–1841). In 1842 he was elected a Member of the Linnean Society.

In 1843, the colonial government of Ceylon appointed him as superintendent of the botanic garden in Peradeniya and island botanist. Here he finished Travels in the Interior of Brazil, principally through the Northern Provinces and the Gold Districts, during the years 1836–41, which was published in London by Reeves Brothers in 1846. He had also made extensive collections in Ceylon towards a complete Flora Zeylanica, but this was not published because of his early death.

Species named for Gardner are titled or.
