= Jerry Yellin =

United States Army Air Forces officer

Jerome Yellin
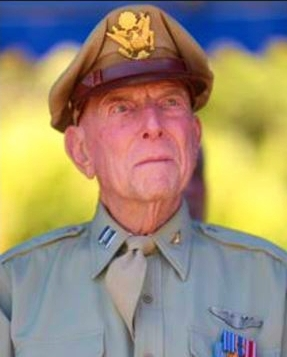
- Born: February 15, 1924; Newark, New Jersey, U.S.
- Died: December 21, 2017 (aged 93); Orlando, Florida, U.S.
- Burial place: Arlington National Cemetery
- Military career
- Allegiance: United States of America
- Branch: United States Army Air Forces
- Service years: 1942–1945
- Rank: Captain (United States O-3)
- Conflicts: World War II; Air raids on Japan; Pacific Ocean theater of World War II Battle of Iwo Jima

Jerome "Jerry" Yellin (February 15, 1924 – December 21, 2017) was a United States Army Air Forces World War II fighter pilot who fought in the Battle of Iwo Jima and who flew 19 Very Long Range (VLR) combat missions over Japan. He has been credited with flying the final combat mission of World War II in a North American P-51 Mustang against a military airfield near Tokyo on August 14, 1945 (August 15, 1945 local time in Tokyo). In his later years, he became well known for his reconciliation with the Japanese and for his work in helping veterans with post-traumatic stress disorder (PTSD). He was the author of four books, including Jerry's Last Mission (originally entitled Of War and Weddings), an autobiography. On January 29, 2014, Texas Governor Rick Perry honored Yellin's military service and commitment to help veterans by making him an honorary Texan. A documentary of his life, Jerry's Last Mission, was released in 2021.

== Early life ==
Jerome Yellin was born in Newark, New Jersey, the son of a real estate developer. His family was Jewish. After graduating from high school in Hillside, New Jersey, he worked night shift at a steel mill, saving money before starting college. On December 7, 1941 the Japanese attacked Pearl Harbor. Two months later, on his 18th birthday, Yellin enlisted in the United States Army Air Forces.

== World War II experience ==
Yellin started his aviation training at Thunderbird Field II in Scottsdale, Arizona and later graduated from Luke Field, Arizona as a fighter pilot in August 1943. Flying P-40 and P 47 Thunderbolt fighter planes, his training continued based out of Hawaii. On March 10, 1944, 15 miles off the coast of Haleiwa, Oahu, Yellin parachuted out of his P-40 at 5,000 feet after the engine failed and he spent 9 hours in a life raft before being rescued. He was assigned to the 78th Fighter Squadron, 15th Fighter Group. President Franklin D. Roosevelt met with General MacArthur in Hawaii in July 1944 and Yellin was chosen by his commanding officer, Jim Tapp, to fly with him in an aerial show for the President. On March 7, 1945 he landed his P-51 on Iwo Jima after the first of three airfields was secured. For the remainder of the battle for the island, Yellin flew strafing and bombing combat missions in support of the Marines who were fighting the well-entrenched Japanese soldiers. Additionally, he led his squadron on combat missions against Japanese forces on the nearby island of Chichijima. On April 7, 1945, he participated in the first land based fighter mission over Japan. In all, Yellin flew 19 dangerous very long range (VLR) missions from Iwo Jima attacking the Japanese mainland and providing air cover to B-29s on bombing missions. He was co-credited with shooting down a Mitsubishi A6M Zero, along with his wingman, 2nd Lieutenant Daniel Mathis, with probably destroying another Zero, and with damaging an Aichi E13A (Jake). He was an exceptional pilot who flew over one thousand hours of missions in various aircraft. Yellin was awarded the Distinguished Flying Cross with an Oak Leaf cluster and the Air Medal with four Oak Leaf clusters. Here is an interview with Lt. Col. Scott Weaver, author of "The Pilots of Thunderbird Field", and Captain Jerry Yellin and about his training at Thunderbird Field.

== Final World War II flight ==
Yellin's final combat mission was executed five days after the U.S. Army Air Forces Boeing B-29 Superfortress Bockscar had dropped a second American nuclear weapon on Japan, on the city of Nagasaki.

Yellin flew along with another pilot, First Lieutenant Phillip Schlamberg, who was piloting a second P-51 as Yellin's wingman. The two men were executing their mission against the airfield at or about the time that Emperor Hirohito announced Japan's acceptance of the Potsdam Declaration, wherein Japan would accept allied terms for unconditional surrender. Yellin and Schlamberg did not hear the military's attempted radio broadcast alerting them that the war had ended.

Immediately after carrying out their mission against the airfield, Yellin and Schlamberg banked steeply into a cloud cover. Yellin emerged from the cloud cover, but Schlamberg had disappeared, apparently shot down, and became the final known combat death of World War II. Schlamberg's body was never recovered. Short on fuel, Yellin began his four-hour flight back to his home base on Iwo Jima, where he learned that the war had ended.

Actually, other missions returned the day after Yellin's including a B-29 bomb wing based in the Marianas, the combined US and British Pacific Fleet aircraft carriers, and Japanese interceptions of B-32 Dominator reconnaissance aircraft over Japan up to the 17th. However, Yellin's mission may have been the last flown by VII Fighter Command from Iwo Jima, and the last mission of the war itself.

In an effort to place the final days of the War in an accurate historical context, it should be pointed out that Yellin and Schlamberg took off for their historic mission from Iwo Jima on the morning of August 14, 1945, hours before Emperor Hirohito took to the airways to announce Japan's surrender. The famous Hirohito surrender broadcast occurred about the time that the two P-51 pilots were carrying out their final military mission, making their mission, apparently, the final mission of the war. Other post-war military skirmishes occurred in the days after the broadcast. But the war effectively ended on August 14, 1945 [August 15 in Japan], when the Emperor announced the Japanese government's acceptance of the Potsdam Accords, making Yellin's mission the last known combat mission of the war. In fact, August 14, 1945 [August 15 in Japan] is recognized as Victory over Japan Day, or "V-J" day, in recognition that World War II effectively ended that day. At 703 PM, August 14, 1945, just hours after Yellin's final mission, President Truman announced Japan's surrender to the nation, setting off celebrations all over the United States, including in New York's Times Square.

Although a handful of military skirmishes took place after Japan announced unconditional surrender to the world, those skirmishes technically took place after the war had effectively ended. World War II officially ended on September 2, 1945, with the Allies accepting Japan's formal written surrender documents on the decks of the USS Missouri in Tokyo Bay.

== The Last Fighter Pilot ==
The story of Yellin's final flight is told in the book The Last Fighter Pilot: The True Story of the Final Combat Mission of World War II, by author Don Brown, published on July 31, 2017. Yellin was a contributor and wrote the foreword for the book.

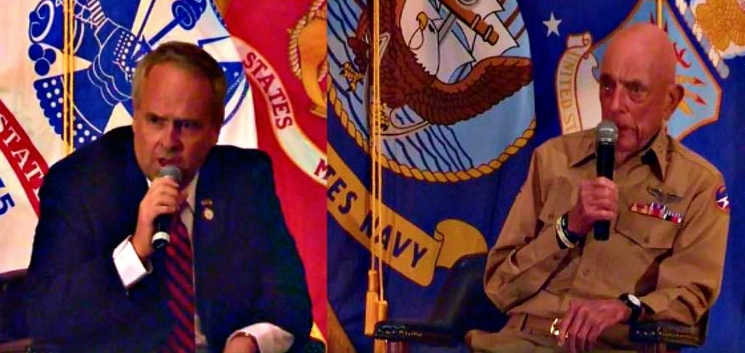
Don Brown & Yellin discuss the book The Last Fighter Pilot at the Richard Nixon Presidential Library, August 3, 2017.

Yellin and Brown appeared together to promote the book's release and to discuss Yellin's final, historic mission at the Ronald Reagan Presidential Library on August 1, 2017. They appeared again together on August 3, 2017, at the Richard Nixon Presidential Library and Museum in Yorba Linda, California to discuss the book and Yellin's experiences in the war. On June 11, 2018, the popular magazine and website Townhall named Last Fighter Pilot as one of "10 World War II Books Every American Should Read."

== Reconciliation ==
On a business trip to Tokyo in early 1980, Yellin described seeing the Japanese as other than the enemy for the first time. In 1984, Yellin's younger son moved to Japan in what would be a life changing event for father and son. The younger Yellin settled in Japan, married a Japanese woman, and bore Jerry three Japanese-American grandchildren. The children's other grandfather had been assigned to a kamikaze squadron in the last days of the war and initially rejected the wedding of his daughter to the younger Yellin. But after learning that Jerry was a P-51 fighter pilot and had flown combat missions on Iwo Jima and against Japan, he told his wife to arrange the marriage so that the blood of a brave man could flow in the veins of his grandchildren. The two older men became friends for the remainder of their lives, and through the bonds of family, Yellin went "from hatred to love" of the Japanese. He traveled extensively to talk about peace and reconciliation. His autobiography, originally published in 1995 with the title Of War and Weddings, has been reissued by Armin Lear Press with the new title Jerry's Last Mission to coincide with the release of the documentary of Yellin's life.

In 2010, Yellin returned to Iwo Jima for the first time as a civilian to participate in the joint Japanese-United States Reunion of Honor ceremony commemorating the soldiers from both countries who fought in the historic battle. He also traveled to Iwo Jima in 2015 and 2016 to participate in the commemorative ceremony.

== Post-traumatic stress disorder ==
Yellin was honorably discharged from the Army Air Forces on December 19, 1945. He returned home suffering from restlessness, depression, and suicidal thoughts due to post-traumatic stress disorder, though the affliction would not be recognized as a medical entity until 1980. He struggled to stay employed. He moved frequently throughout the United States and lived in Israel for a while. In 1975, at the urging of his wife, Helene, Yellin learned Transcendental Meditation (TM) which helped to alleviate his PTSD symptoms. He became an advocate for TM as treatment for PTSD and founded Operation Warrior Wellness as part of the David Lynch Foundation to teach TM to veterans suffering with the illness. The David Lynch Foundation has established the Jerry Yellin Resilient Warrior Fund to honor Yellin and to raise scholarship funds to teach TM to soldiers and first responders suffering from PTSD. He also co-founded Operation Warrior Shield with CMSgt(ret) Edward W Schloeman to teach TM to veterans and first responders. He traveled throughout the United States to talk about his experiences with PTSD and TM.

== Documentary ==
Jerry's Last Mission is a feature-length documentary about Yellin's life . The film describes Yellin's war experiences and his return home filled with hatred for his former enemy and suffering from severe PTSD. It was only when he found Transcendental Meditation decades later that he began the road back to himself. And 42 years after the war, Jerry was confronted with his decades-old fear and hatred when forced to face his enemies once more when his youngest son moved to Japan and married the daughter of a Kamikaze pilot. During the last decades of his life, Jerry dedicated his life to promote peace and understanding between different cultures. The film was directed by Louisa Marino and produced by Melissa Hibbard and Oscar-winning Ed Cunningham. The film is distributed by Utopia and is available for streaming on Altavod, iTunes and Apple TV, and Amazon Prime.

== Books by Yellin ==
In addition to his autobiography, Jerry's Last Mission (originally titled Of War and Weddings) and The Last Fighter Pilot: The True Story of the Final Combat Mission of World War II, written by Don Brown, Yellin published three other books:

The Blackened Canteen is a work of historical fiction based on a true event that occurred on June 20, 1945 when two American bombers collided in mid-air on a bombing mission over Shizuoka, Japan, killing all 23 airmen on the planes. At great personal risk, the remains of the American airmen were buried by a Japanese farmer who subsequently erected a shrine to honor both the American and Japanese killed in the raid. Many years later, in 1971, a Shizuoka citizen learned of the raid and the memorial erected in 1945 and began an annual ceremonial service for the dead Americans and Japanese that continues to this day (citation). Yoko Ono wrote that "having campaigned for peace for many years, this beautiful story strikes a deep chord with me. I hope it will become more widely known around the world and inspire other people, too."

The Resilient Warrior is a book describing Yellin's struggle with PTSD for many years after returning home from the battle field in 1945, how learning TM in 1975 saved his life, and how TM can help others suffering with PTSD.

The Letter is a novel about the divisiveness of religion and politics. Actor Troy Evans (actor) wrote about the book, "As a WW II fighter pilot Jerry Yellin knows a few things about threats to humanity, and this nation. In The Letter he uses his considerable insight to strike a major blow against religious bigotry, hatred, and intolerance. If you are not concerned about the invasion of American politics by religious extremists, you will be when you finish this intriguing novel. I love this book!"

Yellin is also featured in The Last Veterans of World War II: Portraits and Memories by Richard Bell.

== Spirit of '45 and The Iwo Jima Association of America ==
In 2010, Yellin worked with actor Ernest Borgnine and U.S. Senators Daniel K. Inouye and Frank Lautenberg to get Congress to unanimously vote for Spirit of '45 Day, honoring the men and women of the WWII generation, which is observed during the second weekend in August and coinciding with the anniversary of the end of the war and Yellin's final combat flight. As the national spokesman for Spirit of '45, Yellin traveled the country, speaking in support of Spirit of '45 Day and veterans. He appeared with Scarlett Johansson, the grandniece of Phillip Schlamberg, to promote the Spirit of '45 mission.

Yellin was a member of the Iwo Jima Association of America. In 2018, he was posthumously awarded The Major General Fred Haynes USMC Legacy Award to honor his "many years of service educating thousands on the Battle of Iwo Jima…ensuring future generations of Americans will remember the legacy of what happened on that small volcanic island known as Iwo Jima."

== Personal life ==
Yellin married Helene Schulman in 1949 and the couple were together for 66 years. Helene Yellin died in 2015. They had four sons, David Yellin, Steven Yellin, Michael Yellin, and Robert Yellin, and six grandchildren. Three of the grandchildren live in Japan and three live in the United States.

Yellin was an amateur golf champion in New Jersey and was on the United States golf team in the 1965 Maccabiah Games in Israel, winning a silver medal. In the 1960s and 1970s, while living in Florida with his family he was a well known tennis umpire. He was a chair umpire for World Championship Tennis matches played in Hollywood and Aventura, as well as at the WCT finals in Dallas. Jerry also was an umpire at the 1969 US Open.

== Death ==
Yellin died from lung cancer at the home of his son Steven in Orlando, Florida, on December 21, 2017, at the age of 93. His remains were interred with full military honors, including a flyover by A-10 Warthog fighter jets and a P-51 leading the missing man formation, at Arlington National Cemetery on January 15, 2019.

== Awards and decorations ==

United States Army Air Forces pilot badge
Distinguished Flying Cross
Air Medal with three bronze oak leaf clusters	Army Good Conduct Medal	American Campaign Medal
Asiatic-Pacific Campaign Medal with two bronze campaign stars	World War II Victory Medal	Army of Occupation Medal with 'Japan' clasp
