= Old Breed General =

OLD BREED GENERAL: How Major General William Rupertus Broke the Back of the Japanese from Guadalcanal to Peleliu is a 2022 biography and work of military history about Major General William H. Rupertus who commanded the 1st Marine Division in the Pacific War in World War II, and also authored the USMC Rifleman's Creed.

Believed to be the first biographical work on Rupertus, and the first in-depth work on the historical account of the Battle of Tulagi and Gavutu–Tanambogo, America's first ground victory in World War II, OLD BREED GENERAL is co-authored by military author and historian Don Brown, and Amy Rupertus Peacock, who is General Rupertus's granddaughter, and written in a style of creative nonfiction.

Largely using Rupertus's wartime diary and other first-hand sources as historical guides, the authors recount Rupertus’ command in the Pacific from 1942–1944, including not only Tulagi but also the Battle for Henderson Field, the largest and final land battle on Guadalcanal, with U.S Marine ground forces falling under the command of General Rupertus, largely because Major General Alexander Vandegrift who at that time was still the overall commander of the 1st Marine Division, had left Guadalcanal to Noumea, New Caledonia to meet with Vice Admiral William Halsey Jr., at Halsey's direction.

The book also chronicles the 1st Marine Division's respite in Australia in early 1943, where much of the division was recovering from malaria, and where Rupertus served as a military escort for former First Lady Eleanor Roosevelt on her visit to Melbourne and concludes with the final two battles under Rupertus's Command, the Battle of Cape Gloucester in late 1943, and the Battle of Peleliu in late 1944.

On Flag Day, June 14, 2022, Brown & Rupertus-Peacock were invited to speak at The National WWII Museum in New Orleans, where they shared Rupertus's wartime story, as recounted in the book. Later, on August 17, 2022, they were invited to speak about the book at the Ronald Reagan Presidential Library in Simi Valley, California

On September 17, 2022, C-SPAN aired a national broadcast of Brown & Rupertus-Peacock's presentation about Old Breed General from the National World War II Museum

Old Breed General is published by Rowman & Littlefield, through Stackpole Books.
