= Ahmad Shah (Taliban) =

Afghan mujahid (c. 1970 – 2008)

Mullah Ahmad Shah
- Born: c. 1970; Kabul, Kingdom of Afghanistan
- Died: c. April 2008; Khyber Pakhtunkhwa, Pakistan
- Cause of death: Shot to death
- Military career
- Rank: Commander
- Nickname: Mohammad Ismail
- Commands: Anti-Coalition Militia (ACM)
- Conflicts: War in Afghanistan (2001–2021); Operation Red Wings; Operation Whalers

Ahmad Shah (nom de guerre Mohammad Ismail; c. 1970 – c. April 2008) was an Afghan militant leader who commanded a group of fighters operating in eastern Afghanistan and was linked to Gulbuddin Hekmatyar.

== Description and career ==
Ahmad Shah was from the Kuz Kunar District of Nangarhar Province. His full name was "Ahmad Shah Dara-I-Nur" meaning "Ahmad Shah of the Valley of the Enlightened Ones". Shah reportedly fought against the Taliban and al Qaeda in 2001. He eventually switched sides and later became a facilitator for foreign fighters traversing and operating in the challenging terrain of the northeast. He was most closely associated with Gulbuddin Hekmatyar.

In late 2005, he led a large armed group of Anti-Coalition Militia (ACM) fighters who ambushed a team of four Navy SEALs and then shot down an CH-47 helicopter dispatched as part of a quick reaction force for the SEALs, killing a total of 19 U.S. special operations personnel during Operation Red Wings. In the fire fight with the four SEALs, his group was reported to suffer an estimated 35 casualties as a result of a last stand by the four SEALs. The Marine battalion that conceived and planned Operation Red Wings, the 2nd Battalion, 3rd Marines, developed the operation to disrupt ACM activity in the Pech District of the Kunar Province with a focus on Shah. Through human intelligence and signals intelligence, they determined Ahmad Shah had a force of 10 to 20 fighters. Shah and the fighters under his command inflicted heavy casualties on the Navy SEALs and Marines. This encounter was videotaped from the perspective of the anti-coalition forces (ACF) under Shah by an unnamed person using a hand-held video recorder. Video shows the beginning of the encounter, various clips through the fighting where American voices can be heard, and its aftermath, including the remains of 2 of the SEAL team members and the capture and display of their equipment. Helmets, climbing gear, magazines, weapons, a laptop, a spotting scope, and the DoD identification card of PO2 Danny Dietz were clearly shown on screen.

Subsequent to the SEAL ambush and CH-47 shootdown, Shah and his men escaped to Pakistan, where they produced a video from footage they shot of the ambush that included weapons and implements captured from the SEALs. In late July 2005, Shah and his men returned to the Kunar Province and began attacking United States, Coalition, and government of Afghanistan entities. Ahmad Shah's cell was destroyed during Operation Whalers. Operation Whalers, like Operation Red Wings, was planned to disrupt ACM activity in the region to further support ongoing stabilization efforts to ensure a safe voting environment for the 2005 Afghan National Parliamentary Elections. After Operation Whalers, Shah was unable to stage attacks in Afghanistan again.

Shah was killed during a shootout with Pakistan Armed Forces in Khyber Pakhtunkhwa in April 2008 after failing to stop at a security checkpoint whilst transporting a kidnapped trader. An official from Kunar Province stated that Shah had been the "most wanted terrorist in Kunar province."

== Bibliography ==
- Darack, Ed (2009). Victory Point: Operations Red Wings and Whalers – The Marine Corps' Battle for Freedom in Afghanistan. Berkley Hardcover. ISBN 978-0-425-22619-3.
