= Destiny (Brown novel) =

2014 novel by Don Brown

- First edition cover
- Author: Don Brown
- Language: English
- Series: Navy Justice
- Genre: Historical fiction
- Publisher: Mountainview Books, LLC
- Publication date: August 11, 2014
- Publication place: United States
- Media type: Print (paperback), e-book
- Pages: 468
- ISBN: 978-1-941291-06-1
- Preceded by: Malacca Conspiracy

Destiny is a 2014 historical fiction novel written by Don Brown. It is the prequel to Browns Navy Justice Series, perhaps considered to be Brown's signature literary series. Although the novel was the first novel written in the series, it was also the most recently released. Set in World War II, the novel's protagonist is Walter Brewer, the grandfather of Navy Justice Series hero, JAG Officer Lieutenant Zack Brewer. The storyline climaxes in and around the events surrounding the Battle of Normandy. Although the novel was penned in 2003, it was released in 2014, according to Brown, making it the last in the series to be released sequentially, but the first written, chronologically.
