= Thomas John Jehu =

Welsh geologist

Thomas John Jehu FRSE FGS (19 February 1871 – 18 July 1943) was a British physician and geologist. The Jehu-Campbell Fossil Collection at the University of Edinburgh was donated by Jehu in combination with Robert Campbell and is now the main component of their “Highland Border Series” of fossils. Many of the fossils come from the Aberfoyle area.

== Life ==
He was born in Mill House, Llanfair Caereinion, Montgomeryshire, in Wales in 1871, the son of a miller, John Jehu. He was educated at Oswestry High School, then studied medicine at the University of Edinburgh, graduating MB ChB in 1893. He did a further year of science at Edinburgh, gaining another degree (BSc), then studied the natural sciences tripos at St John's College, Cambridge, graduating with a first-class BA in 1898.

Despite gaining his doctorate as a physician (MD), he chose an academic life, first lecturing in geology at the University of St Andrews then, after unsuccessfully trying for the chair in geology at the University of Glasgow (where he lost to John Walter Gregory), moving to the University of Edinburgh in 1914 when he succeeded Professor James Geikie as professor of geology. In 1932 he oversaw the transfer of his department from Old College to King's Buildings where it was thereafter housed in the Grant Institute due to its endowment by Sir Alexander Grant.

In 1905, Jehu was elected a Fellow of the Royal Society of Edinburgh. His proposers were James Geikie, Ben Peach, John Horne, and Ramsay Heatley Traquair. He won the Society’s Keith Prize for the period 1925-27 and served as their Vice President 1929-32. He also served on a commission on coastal erosion in 1908.

He remained a professor until death in Edinburgh, on 18 July 1943, aged 72, when he was succeeded by Arthur Holmes.

== Family ==
In 1904 he married Annie Stewart.
