= Tangi Valley =

Valley in Wardak, Afghanistan

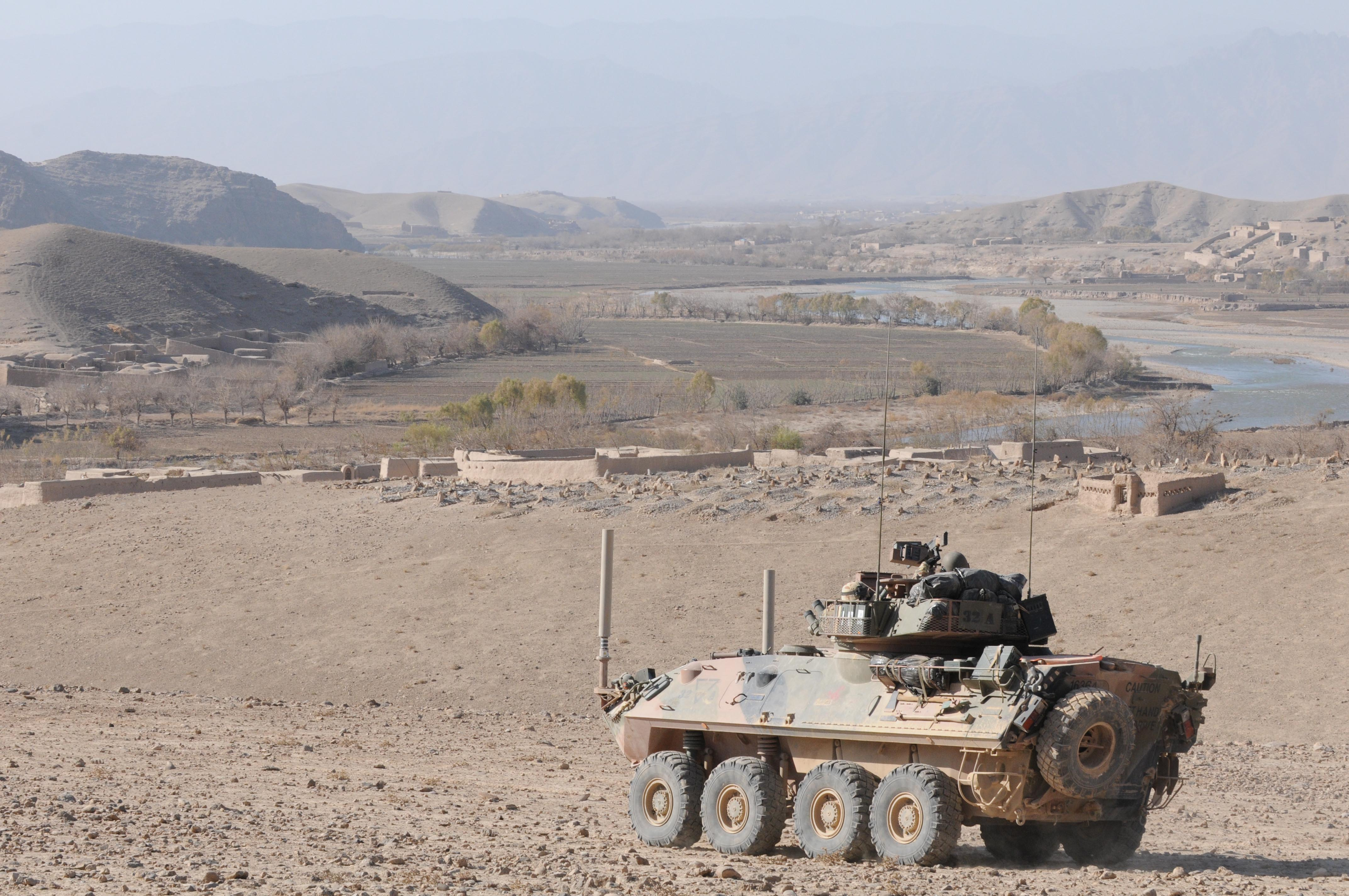
An Australian Army ASLAV overlooking the Tangi Valley in 2010

Tangi Valley (also known as Wardak Valley or Tangi Wardak) is located in the south of Wardak Province in Afghanistan. Between 2009 and 2011 it was occupied by US forces, and became known for the large number of US troops killed there. It was considered an important area and hence was a focus of insurgent activity due to its proximity to Kabul, the capital of Afghanistan.

The 2011 Chinook shootdown took place in the Tangi Valley. The day was the single biggest loss of US lives in Afghanistan.

By 2014, the Taliban had taken over the valley, with the central government at the time no longer having presence or control.
