= Navy Justice =

Book series by Don Brown

- Treason (2005); Hostage (2006); Defiance (2007); Black Sea Affair (2008); Malacca Conspiracy (2010); Destiny (2014, prequel)
- Author: Don Brown
- Country: United States
- Language: English
- Genre: Legal thriller, military fiction
- Publisher: Zondervan; HarperCollins; Mountainview Books, LLC
- Published: 2005–2014
- No. of books: 6

The Navy Justice series consists of five novels authored by Don Brown and published by Zondervan Publishing Company and its parent publishing company, HarperCollins Publishing Company, between 2005 and 2010. The novels, which fit mostly in the military-legal genre, are Treason (2005), Hostage (2005), Defiance (2007), Black Sea Affair (2008), and Malacca Conspiracy (2010). In 2013, film students at Montreat College in Black Mountain, North Carolina, under the direction of Professor Jim Shores, began work on adapting the Navy Justice series for television. In 2010, Defiance, Treason, and Hostage were named by Online Universities among the 50 Best Legal Novels for Both Lawyers and Laymen.

== Treason ==
The storyline of Treason features a young Navy JAG officer, Zack Brewer, who prosecutes three Islamic chaplains in a fictional court-martial for various crimes under the Uniform Code of Military Justice. In the storyline, the three members of the Navy Chaplain Corps, all defendants in the court-martial, have incited sailors and marines to acts of terrorism and Lieutenant Zack Brewer has been chosen to prosecute them for treason and murder.

== Hostage ==
Hostage is the second novel in the Navy Justice series. Like the novel Treason, Hostage also features the life and adventures of a young Navy JAG officer, Zack Brewer. In Hostage, Brewer appears with his co-counsel, Lieutenant Wendy Poole, in a case before the United States Supreme Court in a case to determine the application of the death penalty.

== Defiance ==
Defiance is a 2007 legal-thriller/political thriller. It is the third novel in the Navy Justice series, featuring JAG Officers Zack Brewer and Diane Colcernian. The story follows Brewer as he learns his ex-cocouncil, Diana Colcernian, is still alive. At the same time, he is assigned protective detail, as Navy JAG officers are being targeted and killed. This adventure raises the stakes and any mistakes could inadvertently trigger World War III.

== Black Sea Affair ==
Black Sea Affair is a submarine thriller set largely in the Black Sea and in the waters around Europe.

== Malacca Conspiracy ==
Malacca Conspiracy is a naval thriller set largely in the Malacca Straits and the waters around Indonesia and Malaysia. The novel is set in part on the now-decommissioned U.S. frigate USS Reuben James (FFG-57), and in 2011, the author autographed copies of the novel for the ship's officers and crew, on her return to Pearl Harbor on one of her last cruises. The novel has been reviewed by several national publications, including Publishers Weekly and World Magazine.

== Destiny ==
Destiny is a 2014 historical fiction novel by Don Brown and a prequel to the Navy Justice series. Set during World War II, the story follows Walter Brewer, a rural postal carrier from North Carolina whose family is devastated by the attack on Pearl Harbor. Brewer joins the United States Army and becomes a paratrooper, with the narrative culminating around the events of the D-Day landings in Normandy.

Within the broader series, Walter Brewer is depicted as the grandfather of Lieutenant Zack Brewer, the Navy JAG officer who serves as the protagonist of the later legal-thriller novels. Published after the original contemporary legal thrillers, Destiny functions chronologically as the first story in the Navy Justice timeline because it portrays events in the 1940s that precede the main series by several decades.
