= Operation Whalers =

2005 U.S. military operation during the War in Afghanistan

- Part of the War in Afghanistan (2001–2021)
Date	August 13–18, 2005
Location	Kunar Province, Afghanistan
Result	U.S. operational victory

Belligerents
United States	(Afghanistan) Taliban insurgents

Commanders and leaders
Lieutenant Colonel James E. Donnellan (USMC); Captain Kelly J. Grissom (USMC); 2nd Lieutenant James "J.J." Konstant Jr. (USMC); 2nd Lieutenant Stewart O. Geise (USMC); 1st Lieutenant Ben M. Middendorf (USMC)	Ahmad Shah (WIA)

Units involved
2nd Battalion of the 3rd Marine Regiment (2/3); 2nd Platoon, Echo Company; 3rd Platoon, Fox Company; 1st Platoon, Fox Company; scout/sniper team; mortar SECTION; 3rd Platoon, 212th Military Police Company	Unknown

Strength
60 Marines	40–60, distributed in groups throughout the battlespace

Casualties and losses
1 killed 11 wounded	U.S claim: 40+ killed Ahmad Shah gravely wounded, his cell destroyed

Operation Whalers was a United States Marine Corps military operation that took place in Afghanistan's Kunar Province, between August 13 and August 18, 2005, just weeks after the disastrous Operation Red Wings. Like Operation Red Wings, the objective of Operation Whalers was the disruption of Anti-Coalition Militia (ACM) activity in the region in support of further stabilizing the region for unencumbered voter turnout for the September 18, 2005 Afghan national parliamentary elections.

Operation Whalers was planned and executed by the 2nd Battalion of the 3rd Marine Regiment (2/3). The emphasis of the operation was an Anti-Coalition Militia cell led by Ahmad Shah, which was one of 22 identified ACM groups operating in the region at that time and was the most active. Ahmad Shah's cell was responsible for the Navy SEAL ambush and subsequent MH-47 shootdown that killed, in total, 19 U.S. special operations personnel during Operation Red Wings. Operation Whalers, named after the Hartford / New England Whalers professional hockey team, was the "sequel" to Operation Red Wings in that it was aimed at furthering stabilization of the security situation in the restive Kunar Province of Eastern Afghanistan, a long-term goal of American and coalition forces operating in the area at that time.

Operation Whalers, conducted by a number of Marine infantry companies of 2/3 with attached Afghan National Army soldiers and supported by conventional Army aviation, intelligence, and combat arms forces units and U.S. Air Force aviation assets, proved a success. Anti-Coalition Militia activity dropped substantially and subsequent human intelligence and signals intelligence revealed that Ahmad Shah had been seriously wounded. Shah, who sought to disrupt the September 18, 2005 Afghan national parliamentary elections, was not able to undertake any significant Anti-Coalition operations subsequent to Operation Whalers in Kunar or neighboring provinces.

== Background and planning of Operation Whalers ==
In the wake of the SEAL ambush and helicopter shootdown of Operation Red Wings, Ahmad Shah fled into Pakistan, likely to the Shamshatoo Refugee Camp in the vicinity of Peshawar, Pakistan. During the ambush of the SEALs in Operation Red Wings, two of Shah's men videotaped the firefight and aftermath. Shah subsequently produced a video, distributed by As-Sahab Media, that showed portions of the firefight as well as Michael P. Murphy's and Danny Dietz's deceased bodies, equipment and materials captured from the SEALs, including SOPMOD M4 Carbines fitted with M203 40mm grenade launchers, night vision equipment, a ruggedized laptop with an intact hard drive containing maps of embassies in Kabul, other sensitive information, and a sniper spotting scope, among other items. Due to the global media attention focused on the Red Wings ambush and helicopter shootdown, Ahmad Shah saw his ranks swell, and he planned renewed operations against United States, Coalition, and Government of Afghanistan entities in Afghanistan's Kunar Province. One of these attacks proved successful, a July 24, 2005 improvised explosive device attack against a U.S. Marine Corps convoy that carried 2/3's battalion commander, Lieutenant Colonel James Donnellan. A video made by Shah of this attack included footage shot through a sniper spotting scope, likely the scope taken from the SEALs in Red Wings, which was used to time the improvised explosive device attack.

2/3 processed intelligence that Shah would be returning to the Korangal Valley in the Pech District of the Kunar Province in August, after coalition forces troops left the area at the end of Operation Red Wings II. The battalion developed an operation that sought to "force to contact" Shah in the upper Korangal Valley by inserting troops into surrounding valleys in successive order. With troops forming blocking positions in all valleys, including the Narang and the Chowkay, which intelligence revealed Shah had used in the past to escape into Pakistan, the battalion sought to trap Shah.

== Battles in Chowkay Valley and Korangal Valley ==
The battalion inserted companies of Marines into the Korangal Valley, the Shuryek Valley, the Chowkay Valley, and the Narang Valley, in successive order. While the initial plan assumed that contact between Shah's men and the Marines would occur in the upper Korangal Valley (as the Marines surmised that as Shah discovered that all escape routes were blocked, he'd return to his most familiar ground, the Korangal Valley), contact actually occurred in the Chowkay Valley, primarily with 3rd Platoon, Company F, 2/3 (Fox 2/3). Over the course of a number of days, Shah and his men engaged the Marines in the upper Chowkay Valley in a number of intense firefights. Other engagements occurred in the Korangal Valley and some in the Narang Valley.

== Outcome ==
Whalers ended as a decisive victory for American and Coalition forces against Anti-Coalition Militia in the region, with Shah's cell destroyed, Shah seriously injured, and Shah and his men forced to retreat into Pakistan. The September 18, 2005 Afghan National Parliamentary Elections proceeded relatively unencumbered, the culmination of a number of operations by U.S. forces in the region at that time. More than 40 suspected militants were killed in Kunar Province during the operation.

== Bibliography ==
- Darack, Ed (2009). Victory Point: Operations Red Wings and Whalers – The Marine Corps' Battle for Freedom in Afghanistan. Berkley Hardcover. ISBN 978-0-425-22619-3.
