= Don Brown (author, born 1960) =

American author and attorney

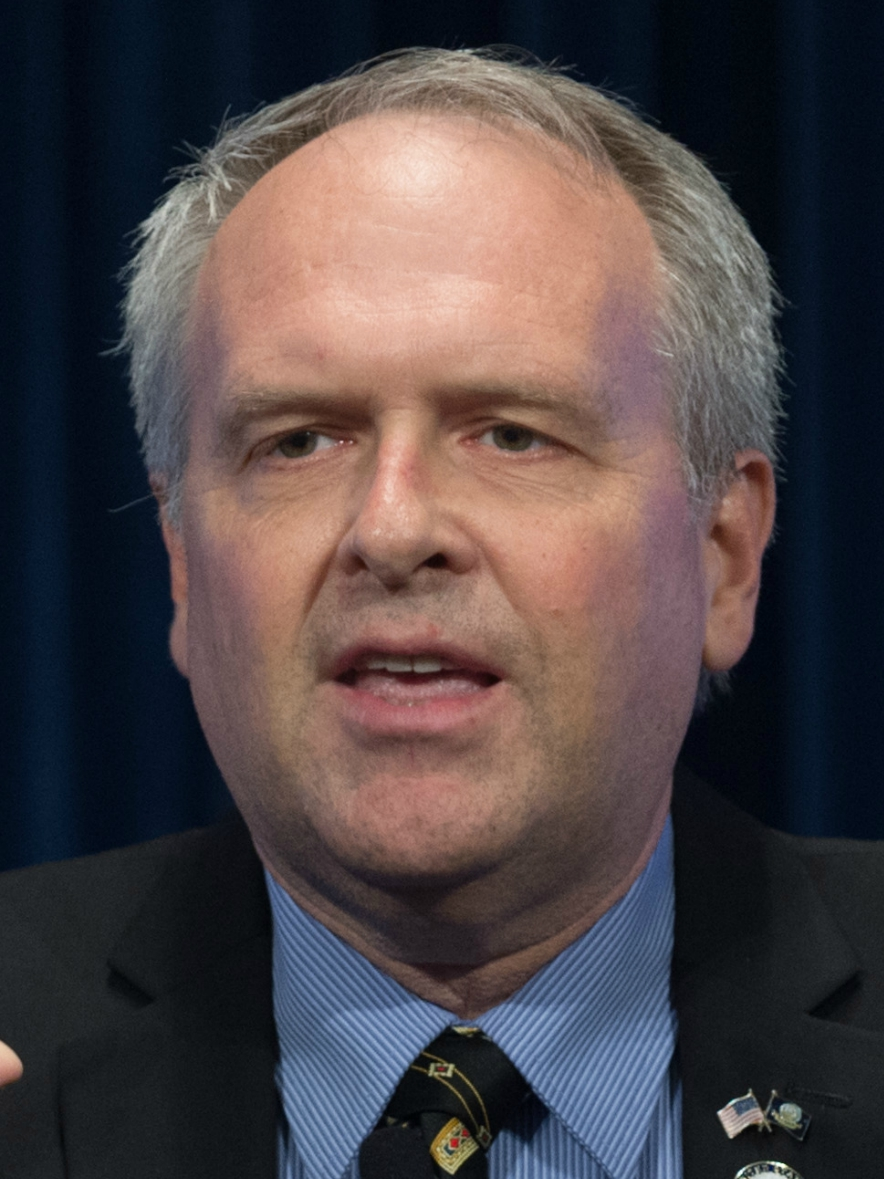
- Brown in 2017
- Born: Donald Mitchell Brown Jr. June 3, 1960 (age 66); Plymouth, North Carolina, U.S.
- Education: University of North Carolina, Chapel Hill (BA); Campbell University (JD)
- Children: 3
- Writing career
- Genres: Thriller; Fiction; Nonfiction; History; Biography; Military
- Notable works: Navy Justice series (2005–2010); Call Sign Extortion 17 (2015); Travesty of Justice (2019)
- Military career
- Allegiance: United States
- Branch: United States Navy
- Rank: Lieutenant Commander
- Website: Official website Campaign website

Donald Mitchell Brown Jr. (born June 3, 1960) is an American author, attorney, and former United States Navy Judge Advocate General (JAG) officer. He has published 15 books on the United States military, including 11 military-genre novels, the best known of which is Treason (2005) in which radical Islamic clerics infiltrate the United States Navy Chaplain Corps. He has published four works of military nonfiction, including his national bestseller, The Last Fighter Pilot: The True Story of the Final Combat Mission of World War II (2017).

Brown may be best known for his work as legal counsel to Army Lieutenant Clint Lorance, who had been convicted of murder by a military court-martial at Fort Bragg when his platoon became involved in a firefight in Afghanistan in 2011, and his authorship of the 2019 book Travesty of Justice: The Shocking Prosecution of Lt. Clint Lorance. On November 15, 2019, President Donald Trump pardoned Lorance, and the book is considered to be a factor in leading to that pardon. Between the release of Travesty of Justice on March 31, 2019, and Lorance's pardon on November 15, 2019, Brown made numerous national television appearances and penned a number of national op-eds urging President Trump to free and exonerate Lieutenant Lorance. On November 27, 2019, Brown and Lorance appeared on Hannity, the nightly national broadcast on the Fox News Channel to discuss the presidential pardon and release.

Brown ran for the Republican nomination in the 2026 United States Senate election in North Carolina, but lost to Michael Whatley. He previously ran in the Republican primary for North Carolina's 8th congressional district in 2024, but lost to Mark Harris.

== Early life and education ==
Brown was born in Plymouth in Washington County, North Carolina, on June 3, 1960. He received a Bachelor of Arts degree from the University of North Carolina at Chapel Hill, and a juris doctor degree from Campbell University's Norman Adrian Wiggins School of Law.

== Legal career ==
Brown spent five years as a military attorney in the United States Navy Judge Advocate General's Corps. He earned a nonresident certificate in international law from the Naval War College, and published a legal position paper in the Navy's Law Review on how to defend against temporary injunctions filed against the military. He remained on inactive status with the Navy until 1999, when he separated from the service as a lieutenant commander. Brown also worked as a special assistant to the United States Attorney for the Southern District of California.

He is currently licensed to practice in North and South Carolina, and is the owner of Brown and Associates, PLLC, a law firm located in Charlotte, North Carolina, where he practices law in the areas of civil litigation, military law, criminal defense, family law, and estate planning.

In 2018, Brown joined the legal team as one of four military JAG officers representing Army First Lieutenant Clint Lorance, and in 2019 published the book Travesty of Justice: The Shocking Prosecution of Lt. Clint Lorance. Lorance had been convicted for second-degree murder in 2013 by a military court-martial, when American paratroopers in his platoon on his command fired on three men on a motorcycle in Afghanistan, who were speeding towards their position. In Travesty of Justice, Brown laid out the defense contentions, including the claim that Army prosecutors withheld biometrics evidence proving that the motorcycle riders were enemy Taliban bombmakers. In a series of national television appearances and op-eds for Fox News in the summer of 2019, Brown pressed Lorance's case further, urging President Donald Trump to provide presidential relief for Lorance, and accused the military justice system of corruption for the prosecutions of Lorance, Navy SEAL Eddie Gallagher, and Army Green Beret Matt Golsteyn.

== Authorship ==
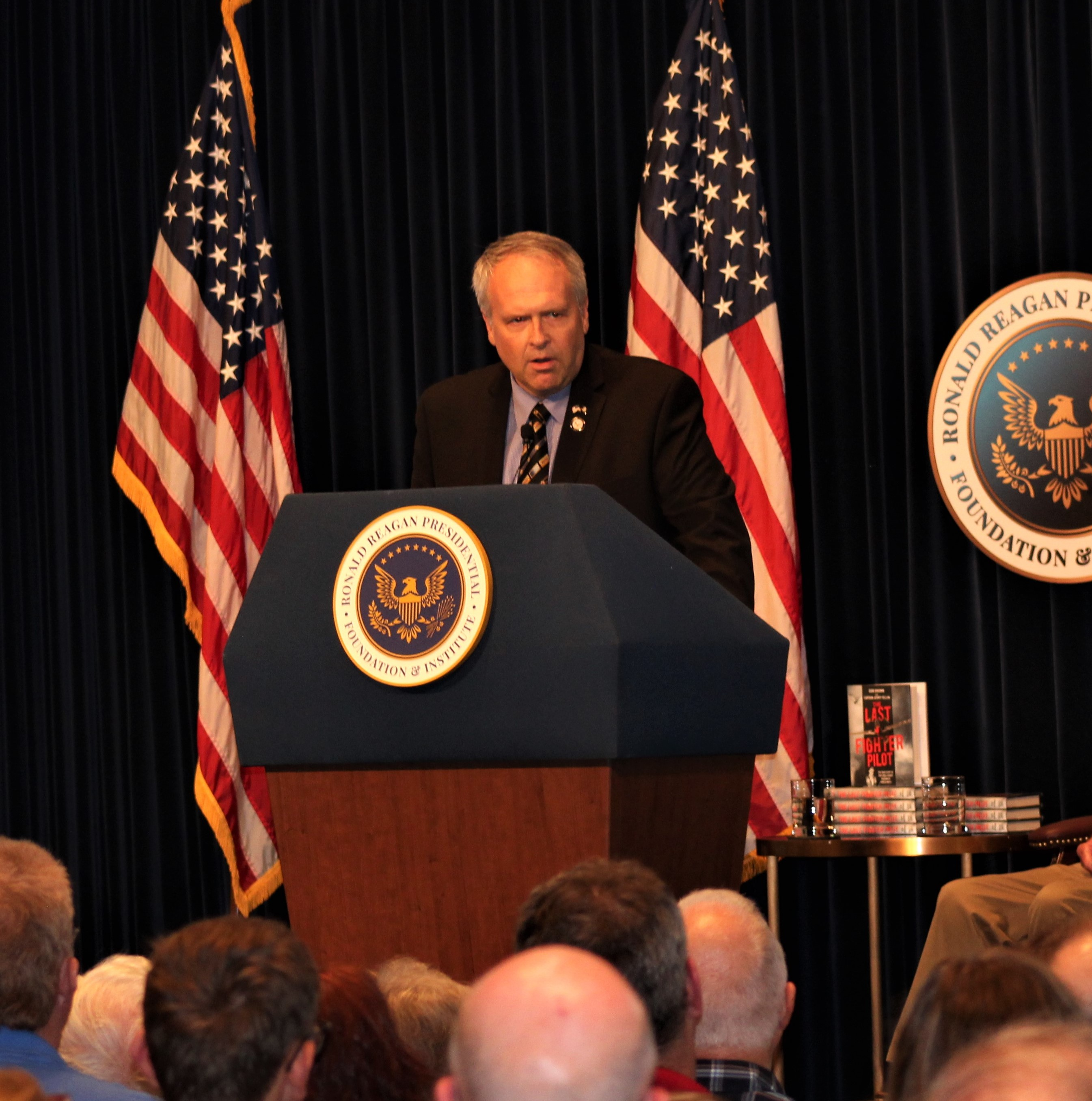
Brown discussing The Last Fighter Pilot at the Ronald Reagan Presidential Library, 2017

Brown is the author of Zondervan Publishing's Navy Justice series with the fiction works Treason (2005), Hostage (2005), Defiance (2006), Black Sea Affair (2008), and Malacca Conspiracy (2010), in which terrorists launch attacks against oil tankers in the Malacca Straights.

In his Pacific Rim series, Brown wrote his sixth novel Thunder in the Morning Calm (2011) on the issue of whether American servicemen who were listed as MIAs may still be alive in North Korea since the Korean War. Brown stated in interviews that he wrote it to bring attention to the issue. His seventh novel Fire of the Raging Dragon, a geopolitical action-thriller set in the South China Sea, was released through HarperCollins publishers in November 2012.

Brown wrote Call Sign Extortion 17: The Shoot-Down of SEAL Team Six (2015) on the August 2011 downing of a United States Army CH-47 Chinook helicopter in the War in Afghanistan, which killed the air crew along with seven Afghan military personnel and 17 members of Navy SEAL Team Six. Brown retells the wartime action, explains the life stories of the service members killed that day, and examines the official military explanation of the incident contained in the infamous Colt Report, arguing that the series of events was gross incompetence or a massive cover-up.

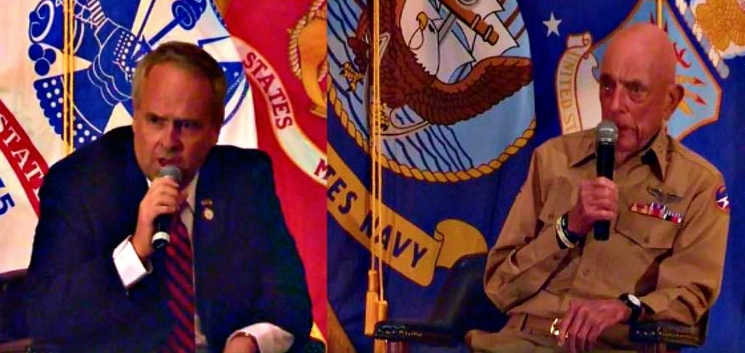
Brown and Jerry Yellin discuss the book The Last Fighter Pilot, at the Richard Nixon Presidential Library in 2017

In March 2017, Brown released his nonfiction work The Last Fighter Pilot: The True Story of the Final Combat Mission of World War II. The book features the true story of Captain Jerry Yellin, U.S. Army Air Force, who flew the final combat mission of World War II over Japan on August 15, 1945, from Iwo Jima, and focuses on the last six months of the air war against Japan, flown by American fighter pilots stationed on Iwo Jima, who arrived on the island in March 1945, and remained there until the war's end.

In August 2017, Brown and Yellin appeared together to kick off the book's release at the Ronald Reagan Presidential Library and the Richard Nixon Presidential Library and Museum in Yorba Linda, California to discuss the book and Yellin's experiences in the war. Publishers Weekly announced that the book had been named to it national bestseller's list for hardcover nonfiction for the week ending August 7, 2017. The popular magazine and website Townhall named Last Fighter Pilot as one of "10 World War II Books Every American Should Read."

== Published works ==
Navy Justice series

- Treason (Zondervan Publishing, 2005) ISBN 0310259339
- Hostage (Zondervan Publishing, 2006) ISBN 0310259347
- Defiance (Zondervan Publishing, 2007) ISBN 0310272130
- Black Sea Affair (Zondervan Publishing, 2007) ISBN 0310272149
- Malacca Conspiracy (Zondervan Publishing 2010) ISBN 0310272157
- Destiny (Mountainview Books, LLC, 2014) ISBN 9781941291061

Pacific Rim series

- Thunder in the Morning Calm (Zondervan Publishing, 2011) ISBN 0310330149
- Fire of the Raging Dragon (Zondervan Publishing, 2012) ISBN 9780310410447
- Storming the Black Ice (HarperCollins Publishing, 2014) ISBN 9780310410454

Navy JAG series

- Detained (HarperCollins Publishing, 2015) ISBN 9780310338055
- Code 13 (Zondervan Publishing, 2016) ISBN 0310338077

Nonfiction

- Call Sign Extortion 17: The Shoot-Down of SEAL Team Six (Rowman & Littlefield Publishing, through Lyons Press - 2015) ISBN 1493007467
- The Last Fighter Pilot: The True Story of the Final Combat Mission of World War II (Salem Media Group, through Regnery Publishing - 2017) ISBN 1621575063
- Travesty of Justice: The Shocking Prosecution of Lt. Clint Lorance (WildBlue Press - 2019) ISBN 1948239116
- Old Breed General: How Marine Corps General William H. Rupertus Broke the Back of the Japanese in World War II from Guadalcanal to Peleliu Hardcover with Amy Rupertus Peacock (Stackpole Books (Rowman & Littlefield) - 2022) ISBN 0811770346
- Kangaroo Court: How Dirty Prosecutors and Sleazy Lawyers Destroy Political Opponents, Attack Free Speech, and Subvert the Constitution (Post Hill Press - 2024) ISBN 9798895650424

== See also ==
- List of American novelists
- List of thriller writers
- List of United States Navy people
- List of military writers
- List of University of North Carolina at Chapel Hill alumni
