= List of United States Navy SEALs =

Notable members of the US Navy SEALs and UDTs

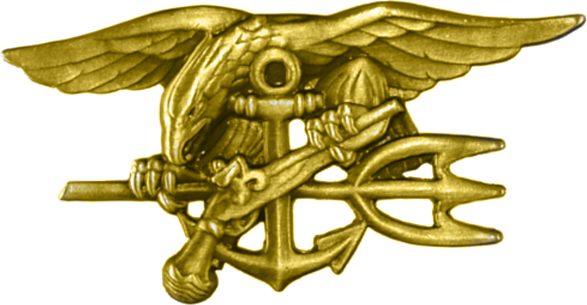
Special Warfare insignia known as the "SEAL Trident."

This list of United States Navy SEALs includes both current and former notable members of the Naval Special Warfare teams, known as "SEALs" for "SEa", "Air" and "Land", the full spectrum of environments in which they operate.

== List ==
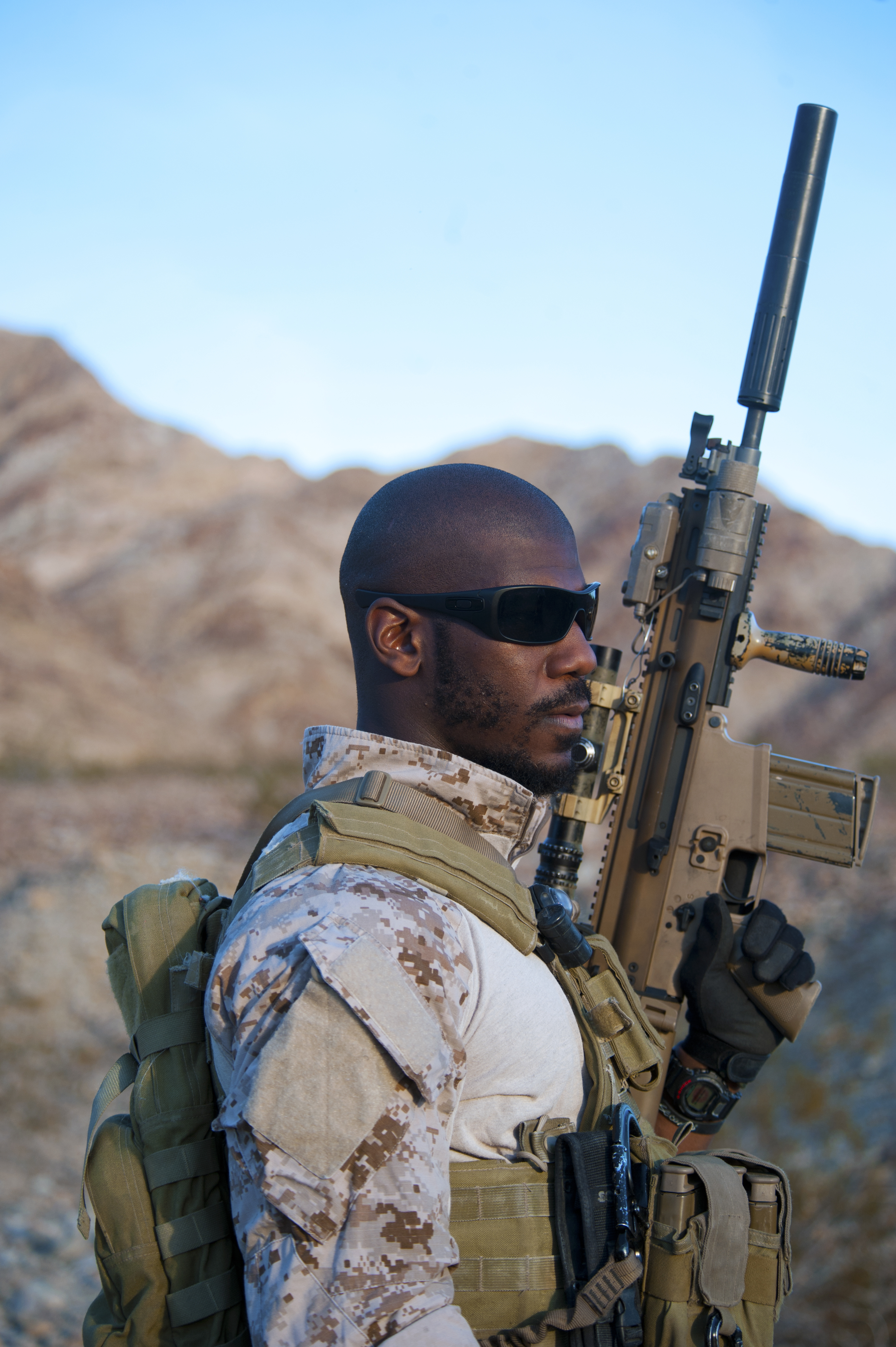
Remi Adeleke in 2012.

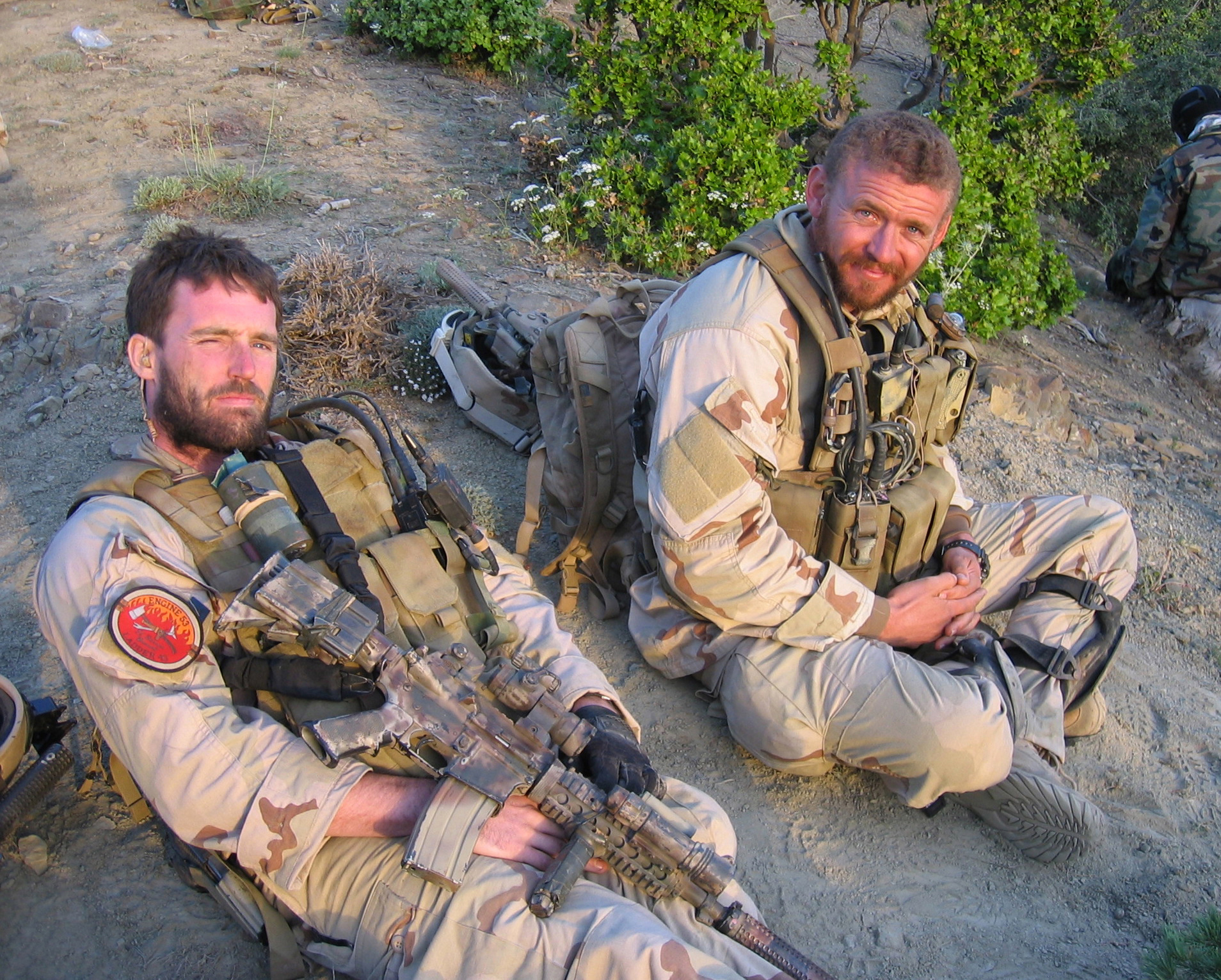
Michael P. Murphy and Matthew Axelson in Afghanistan in 2005.

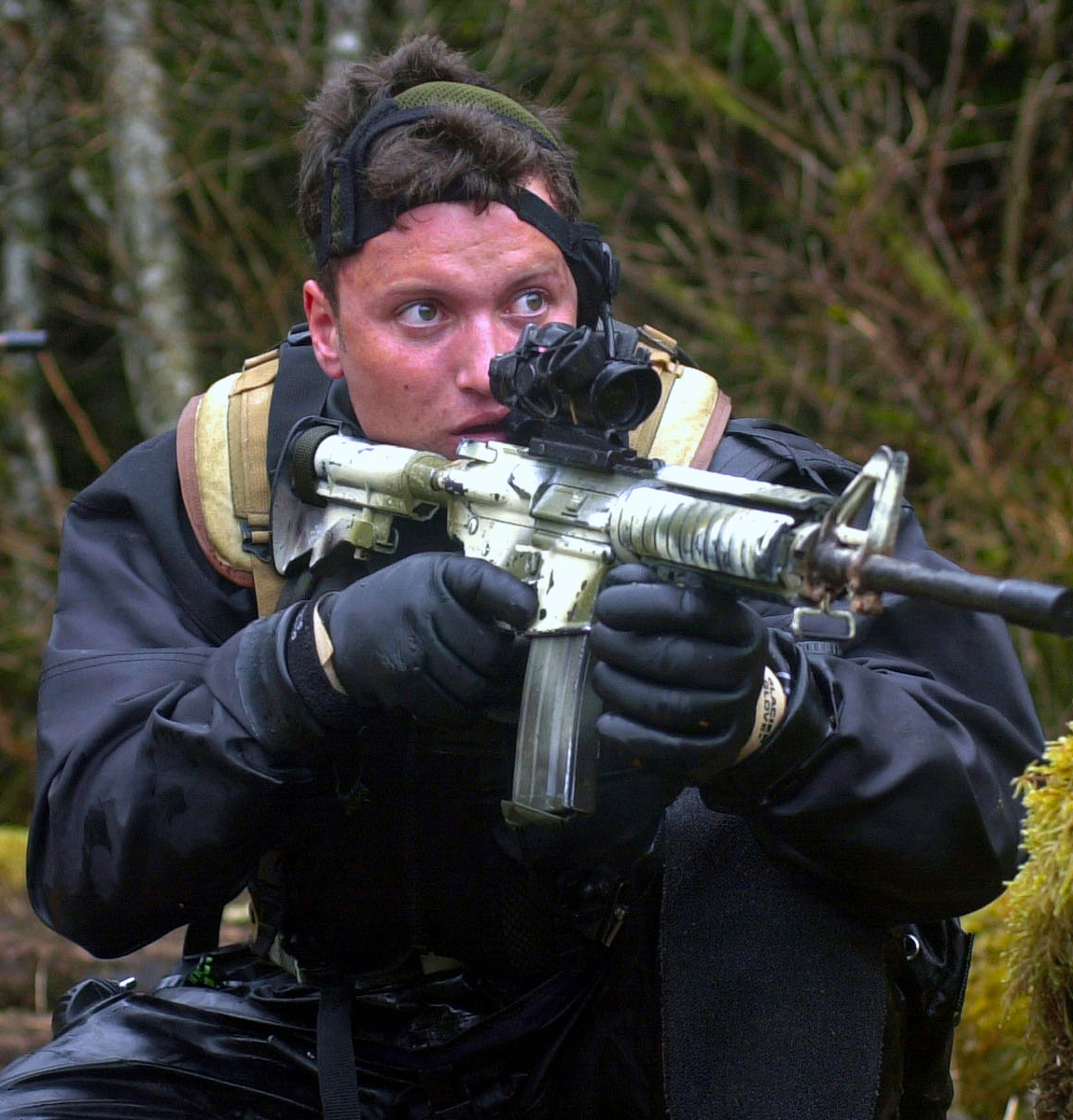
Matt Bissonnette during Northern Edge in 2001.

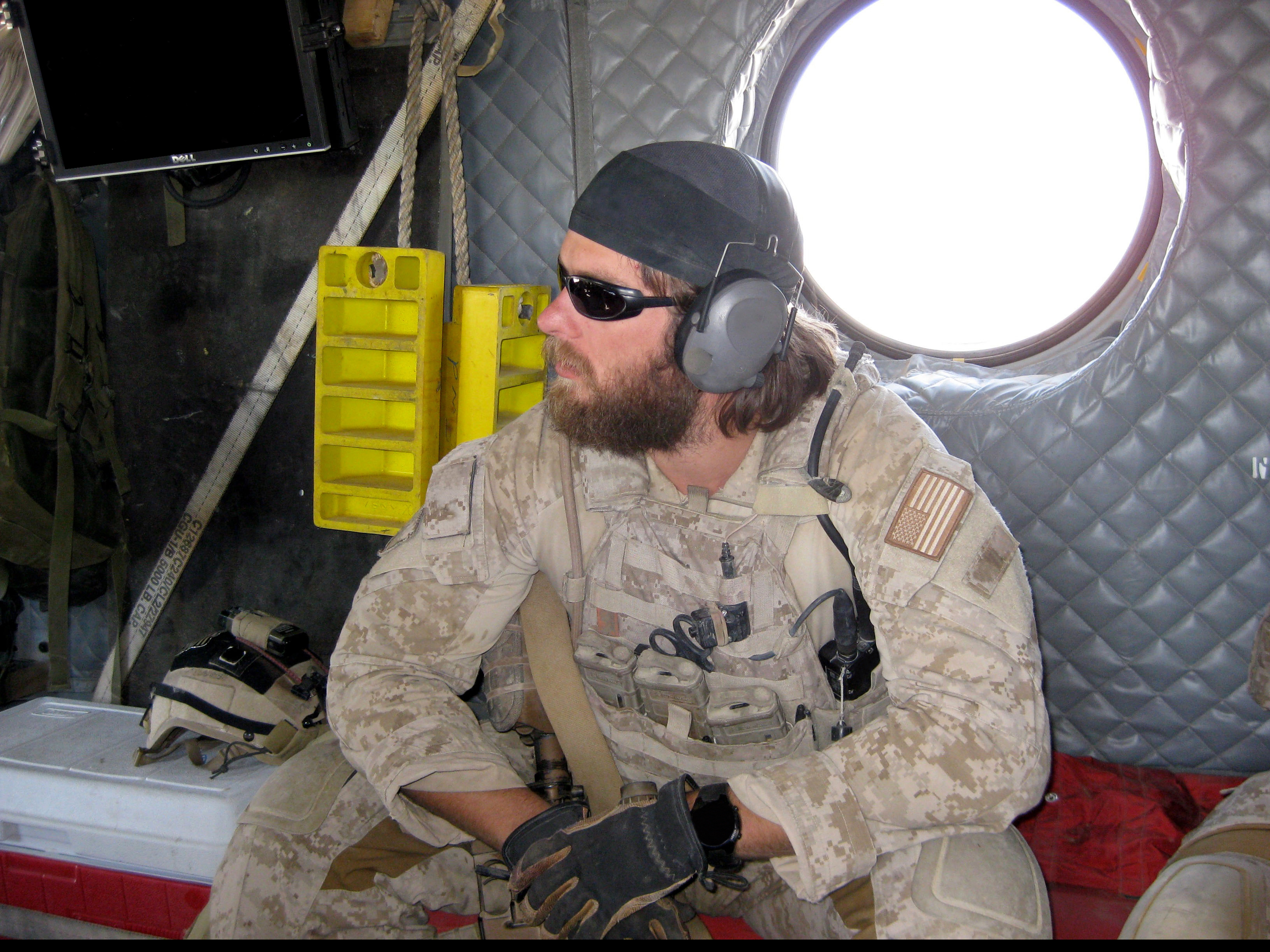
Edward Byers in Afghanistan.

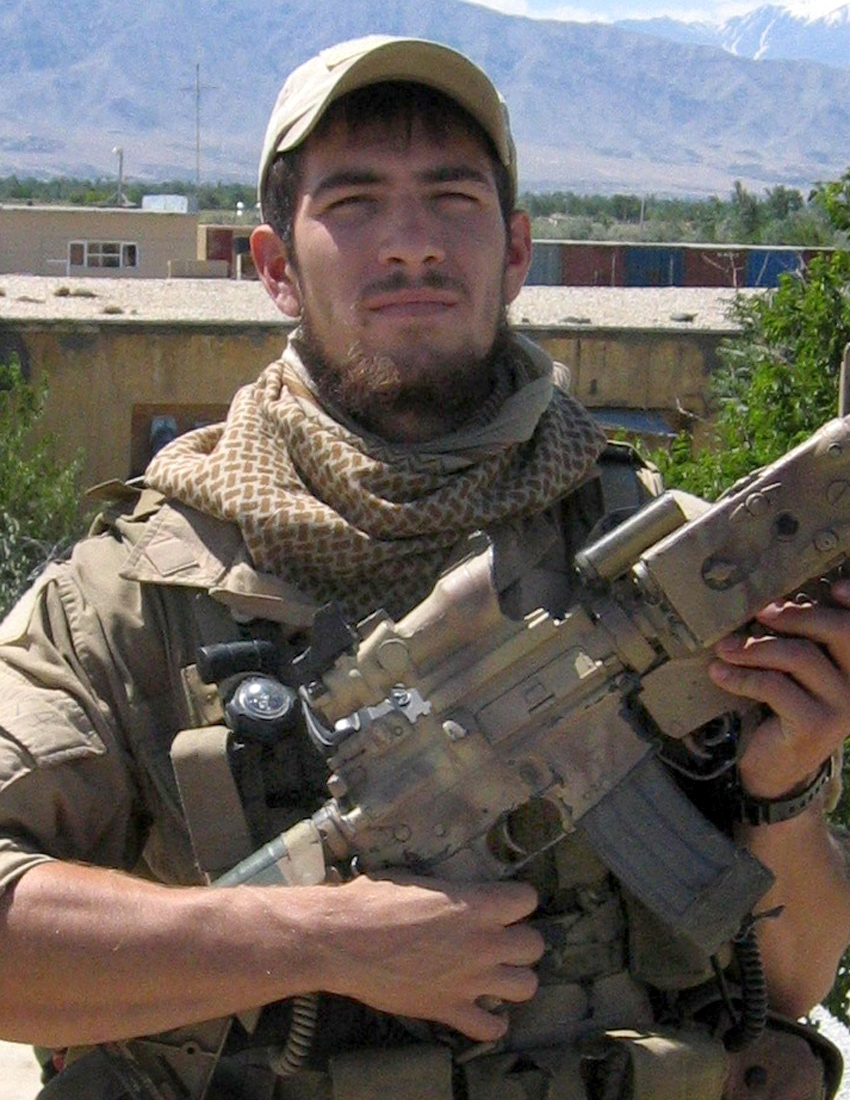
Danny Dietz in 2005.

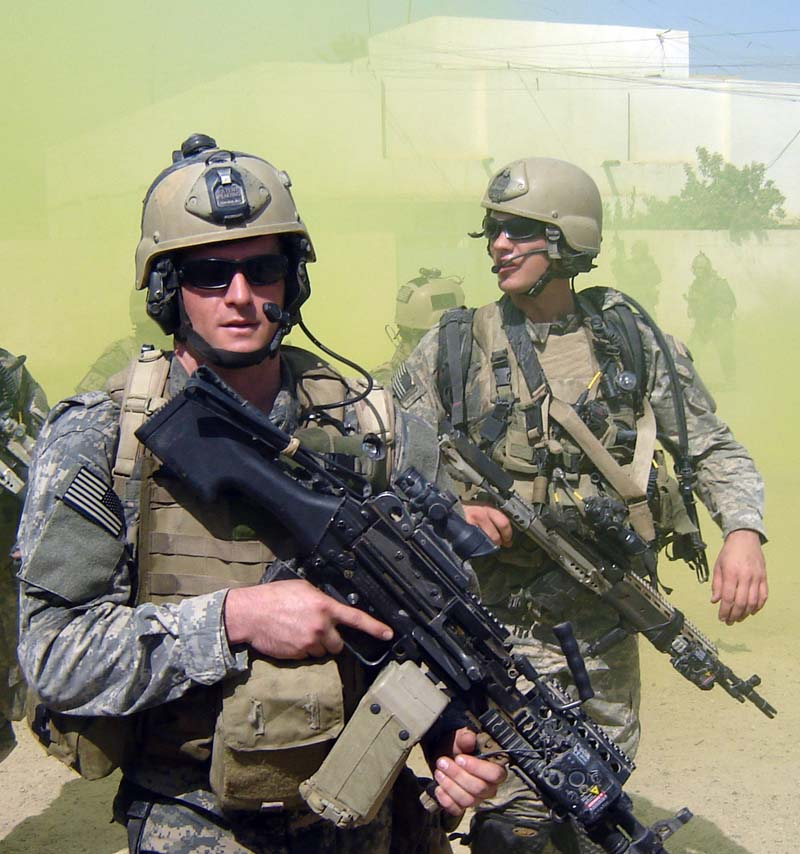
Michael Monsoor (left) in Iraq in 2006.

- Remi Adeleke – writer, actor, and former Navy SEAL.
- Jonathan Allen – Member of SEAL Team Two and internet personality known professionally as MrBallen.
- Matthew Axelson – Member of SEAL Delivery Vehicle Team One, killed in action during Operation Red Wings. Recipient of the Navy Cross.
- Harry Beal – Underwater demolition team member, he was the first to volunteer for the SEAL program at its founding in 1962.
- Chris Beck – DEVGRU member. After retiring Beck came out as a transgender woman in 2013, changed his name to Kristin and co-authored the memoir Warrior Princess. In 2022, he detransitioned and became an anti-trans activist.
- Matt Bissonnette – Operator in Operation Neptune Spear and author of No Easy Day.
- Roy Boehm – WWII Pacific War veteran. First commanding officer of SEAL Team Two (1962), considered godfather of all SEALs.
- Rudy Boesch – Founding member of SEAL Team Two in 1962 and Vietnam War veteran. He was a competitor in the TV reality shows Survivor and Survivor: All-Stars, and host of the reality series Combat Missions. Former "Bullfrog" or longest-serving active-duty SEAL member.
- Matt Bracken – SEAL officer, served in Beirut. Author of "Enemies Foreign and Domestic" series and conservative political commentator who has published or been interviewed on InfoWars, Instapundit, and other right of center sites. BUD/S Class 105.
- Frank M. Bradley – Vice admiral and Commander of Special Operations Command Central.
- Thomas L. Brown II – Retired Rear admiral and commander of Special Operations Command South and Naval Special Warfare Group One.
- Phil H. Bucklew – First commanding officer, Naval Operations Support Group One (later renamed Naval Special Warfare Group One), twice awarded the Navy Cross and considered the "Father of Modern SPECWAR."
- Edward C. Byers Jr. – Medal of Honor recipient; as an assault team member attached to a Joint Task Force in support of Operation Enduring Freedom on 8 December 2012 when he rescued an American hostage (Dr. Dilip Joseph) in the Qarghah’i District of Laghman Province, Afghanistan.
- James F. Cahill – First person to scuba dive in New England waters, founder of first retail scuba diving chain, one of the first UDT members.
- Albert Calland – Retired vice admiral, commanding officer of SEAL Team One (1992–1995); Naval Special Warfare Development Group (1997–1999); Naval Special Warfare Command (2002–2004) and Deputy Director of the Central Intelligence Agency. Graduate of the United States Naval Academy.
- Jack Carr – Former sniper and officer with 20 years of service. Became a successful author after retiring.
- Christopher Cassidy – NASA Astronaut, SEAL platoon commander at SEAL Team Two and SEAL Delivery Vehicle Team Two. Graduate of the United States Naval Academy.
- Dennis Chalker – Retired Master Chief and founding member of SEAL Team Six and Red Cell.
- Al Clark – Co-founder of Blackwater.
- Dick Couch – Author of several books on SEALs including The Warrior Elite: Forging of SEAL Class 228, The Finishing School, and Down Range: Navy SEALs in the War on Terrorism. Graduate of the United States Naval Academy.
- Cade Courtley – Actor, contestant on the reality series Combat Missions, and host of Spike's Surviving Disaster.
- Eli Crane – Member of the House of Representatives for Arizona's 2nd congressional district.
- Dan Crenshaw – Member of SEAL Team Three and member of the House of Representatives for Texas's 2nd congressional district.
- Keith Davids – Rear admiral, former commanding officer of SEAL Team One and Naval Special Warfare Center.
- Rorke Denver – SEAL Team Three. Former BUD/S first phase instructor. Starred in the film Act of Valor.
- Danny Dietz – Member of SEAL Delivery Vehicle Team Two, killed in action during Operation Red Wings in Kunar Province, Afghanistan. Recipient of the Navy Cross.
- Mark L. Donald – Navy Cross recipient during Operation Enduring Freedom.
- Ronald A. Foy – Rear admiral and former troop commander with Naval Special Warfare Development Group. Commander, Special Operations Command - Africa
- Eddie Gallagher – Chief Petty Officer. Notable for a controversial war crime case in which he was acquitted.
- Ed Gallrein – Served in the US military for three decades, serving with US Navy SEAL Team Six. Rose to the rank of Navy captain, as he was deployed to Panama, Afghanistan, Iraq, and the Persian Gulf. Received multiple Bronze Star Medals and Presidential Unit Citations. Republican Party nominee in the U.S. House of Representatives election for Kentucky's fourth congressional district in 2026.
- David Goggins – Only member in the US Armed Forces to complete SEAL training, Ranger School, and Air Force Tactical Air Controller training. Also an ultra-marathon runner, motivational speaker, and former Guinness world record holder of most pull-ups in 24 hours (4030 in 17 hours).
- William Goines – Founding member of SEAL Team Two in 1962 and retired Master chief petty officer. Vietnam War veteran and Bronze Star metal recipient.
- Marshall Goldberg – College Football Hall of Fame and NFL All Star football player.
- Eric Greitens – Governor of Missouri, Founder and Chairman of The Mission Continues, Rhodes Scholar.
- Robert Harward – Vice admiral and former commanding officer of SEAL Team Three and Naval Special Warfare Group One. Former DEVGRU assault team leader and graduate of the United States Naval Academy.
- Scott Helvenston – Youngest SEAL in history to complete BUD/S; worked as private military contractor in Operation Iraqi Freedom. He was killed during an ambush in Fallujah, Iraq in March 2004.
- Carl Higbie – Led the raid capturing the Butcher of Fallujah. Author of Enemies, Foreign & Domestic: A SEAL's Story and Battle on the Home Front.
- Frank Hoagland – Ohio State Senate, Senator representing 30th District. Served with SEAL Team Four and DEVGRU.
- Hugh W. Howard – Rear admiral and former commander of Naval Special Warfare Development Group.
- P. Gardner Howe III – Retired vice admiral and former commander of Special Operations Command Pacific and Naval Special Warfare Group Three.
- Harry Humphries – Silver Star recipient, Vietnam War veteran, Hollywood actor and technical advisor for films.
- Damian Jackson – Former professional football player.
- Ryan "Biggles" Job – Wounded in combat during an overwatch mission with Chris Kyle, Kevin Lacz and Marc Lee; died in 2009 in an incident of medical malpractice
- Draper L. Kauffman – Considered the "Father of Naval Combat Demolition". Served during World War II and retired as a rear admiral.
- Charles Keating IV – Sniper and Navy Cross recipient.
- Joseph D. Kernan – Retired vice admiral and former commanding officer, SEAL Team Two, Naval Special Warfare Development Group, and Naval Special Warfare Command. Graduate of the United States Naval Academy.
- Bob Kerrey – Medal of Honor recipient, Vietnam War veteran, Democratic United States Senator from Nebraska, 1989–2001, and president of The New School, 2001–2010.
- Jonny Kim – Member of SEAL Team Three. Graduate of Harvard Medical School (M.D.); NASA astronaut; Silver Star and Bronze Star with Combat "V" device.
- Colin J. Kilrain – Retired vice admiral and former commanding officer, SEAL Team Four and Naval Special Warfare Group Two.
- Erik S. Kristensen – Graduate of the United States Naval Academy, killed during rescue mission as part of Operation Red Wings.
- Alexander Krongard – Retired Rear Admiral and former commanding officer, SEAL Team Seven, Naval Special Warfare Group One.
- Chris Kyle – Iraq War veteran and sniper with SEAL Team Three. Although the US military does not confirm kills, it is said he has a record 160 confirmed kills (of a claimed 255). He was labelled, by himself, the "Most lethal sniper in US military history".
- Kevin Lacz – Former SEAL Team Three sniper, New York Times bestselling author of "The Last Punisher", and actor and technical advisor in the Oscar-winning Chris Kyle biopic American Sniper.
- Frank J. Larkin – Sergeant at Arms of the United States Senate and retired United States Secret Service agent
- Kaj Larsen – Former SEAL lieutenant and journalist with CNN, CurrentTV, and Current TV's Emmy-winning investigative journalism series Vanguard.
- Marc Alan Lee – First SEAL killed in combat during Operation Iraqi Freedom. Awarded the Silver Star, Bronze Star with Valor and the Purple Heart.
- Brian L. Losey – Rear admiral and former commander of the Naval Special Warfare Command, Combined Joint Task Force – Horn of Africa, and Naval Special Warfare Development Group.
- Michael D. Lumpkin – Served as Assistant Secretary of Defense for Special Operations/Low Intensity Conflict 2013–2016. Acting Under Secretary of Defense for Policy, Special Envoy US Department of State in 2017. Former Commissioner on Afghanistan War Commission in April 2022. Chief of Staff, US Immigration and Customs Enforcement 2023-2025.
- Marcus Luttrell – Navy Cross recipient for heroism, sole survivor of Operation Red Wings. Twin brother of Morgan Luttrell.
- Morgan Luttrell – Member of the House of Representatives for Texas's 8th congressional district. Former SEAL officer with 14 years of service. Twin brother of Marcus Luttrell.
- Richard "Dick" Lyon – Rear admiral and first Bullfrog (longest-serving active duty member of the US Navy SEALs) and first UDT-SEAL to achieve flag rank.
- Richard "Mac" Machowicz – Former SEAL and founder of Bukido training system. Host of Discovery Channel's Futureweapons and co-host on Spike' TVs Deadliest Warrior.
- Joseph Maguire – Former commanding officer of SEAL Team Two and commanding officer at Naval Special Warfare Center.
- Richard Marcinko – Served two combat tours in the Vietnam War before serving as commanding officer of SEAL Team Two (1974–1976). First commanding officer of SEAL Team Six from October 1980 to July 1983 and Red Cell from 1984 to 1986; co-author of New York Times bestseller Rogue Warrior.
- Donald L. McFaul – Killed in action during Operation Just Cause and posthumously awarded the Navy Cross for heroism. USS McFaul (DDG-74), a guided missile destroyer, is named after him.
- John Joseph McGuire III – Member of the U.S. House of Representatives from Virginia's 5th district.
- William H. McRaven – Retired admiral and former commanding officer of SEAL Team Three, Joint Special Operations Command and US Special Operations Command.
- Michael A. Monsoor – Posthumous Medal of Honor recipient for jumping on an enemy hand grenade during a firefight in Iraq to save fellow SEALs.
- Scott P. Moore – Retired Rear admiral and former commanding officer of SEAL Team Two and Naval Special Warfare Development Group from 2007 to 2009. Graduate of the United States Air Force Academy.
- Faauuga Muagututia – A competitor for American Samoa at the 1994 Winter Olympics in the bobsleigh.
- Michael P. Murphy – Medal of Honor recipient, exposed himself to fire while calling in support during Operation Red Wings in Afghanistan.
- Thomas R. Norris – Vietnam War veteran, Medal of Honor recipient and retired FBI agent. Founding member of FBI Hostage Rescue Team in 1983.
- Eric T. Olson – Veteran of The First Battle of Mogadishu, Silver Star recipient, commanding officer of Naval Special Warfare Development Group from 1994 to 1997. Former commander, Naval Special Warfare Command. First SEAL to achieve the rank of vice admiral and admiral; the first Navy officer to command US Special Operations Command. Graduate of the United States Naval Academy.
- Robert J. O'Neill – Reportedly fired the fatal shots into Osama bin Laden during Operation Neptune Spear in 2011 with DEVGRU. Also participated in the rescue of Captain Richard Phillips during the Maersk Alabama hijacking as well as the rescue of Marcus Luttrell during Operation Red Wings. Later a motivational speaker and author of The Operator.
- William Owens – Killed in action during the Yakla raid in Yemen.
- William Payne – New Mexico state senator, deputy commander of SEAL Team One and deputy director of operations, Center for Special Operations, US Special Operations Command.
- Chuck Pfarrer – Former SEAL Team Four and DEVGRU operator from 1984 to 1986; screenwriter with credits including The Jackal, Darkman, Red Planet, Virus, Hard Target, Navy SEALs; author of the New York Times bestseller SEAL Target Geronimo: Inside The Mission to Kill Osama Bin Laden, Warrior Soul: The Memoir of a Navy SEAL and the reality-thriller Killing Che.
- Erik Prince – Founder, former CEO, and current chairman of private military contractor Academi, (formerly known as Blackwater).
- Sean A. Pybus – Retired vice admiral and commanding officer of Naval Special Warfare Command from 2011 to 2013. Served as commander, Special Operations Command Pacific from 2009 to 2011.
- Aldo Ray Actor. Member of UDT-17. Saw active duty during the invasion of Okinawa.
- Jason Redman – Founder and spokesperson of the nonprofit organization Wounded Wear and the author of the memoir The Trident: The Forging and Reforging of a Navy SEAL Officer.
- Thomas R. Richards – Vietnam War veteran and Rear admiral. Former commander, Naval Special Warfare Command.
- Mike Ritland – Public speaker, podcaster, and working/protection dog trainer. Created the Warrior Dog Foundation which,"transitions our country's working K9s from an operational environment into retirement."
- Theodore Roosevelt IV – Vietnam-era UDT and great-grandson of President Theodore Roosevelt.
- Shawn Ryan – Founded the tactical training company "Vigilance Elite" and the "Shawn Ryan Show" podcast. Served in SEAL Teams Two and Eight.
- Craig "Sawman" Sawyer – Served in the United States Marine Corps, then transitioned to the Navy to pursue special operations career as a SEAL. He served with SEAL Team One and as a sniper with DEVGRU.
- Milton Sands III Rear admiral and Commander, Naval Special Warfare Command
- Mark A. Schafer – Rear admiral and Commander, Special Operations Joint Task Force - Central. Former commander, US Naval Forces Korea.
- Tim Sheehy – Founder of Bridger Aerospace and incumbent U.S. Senator from Montana.
- William M. Shepherd – First SEAL in space, first American commander of the International Space Station.
- Don Shipley – Served in SEAL Teams One and Two. Former BUD/S and NSW Demolitions instructor.
- Britt K. Slabinski – Medal of Honor recipient for actions in Afghanistan (upgraded from Navy Cross in 2018). Former member of DEVGRU from 1994 to 2008 and former command master chief of Naval Special Warfare Group Two. Navy Cross recipient for heroism during Operation Anaconda in 2002.
- Neil Smit – Retired Lieutenant Commander at DEVGRU. Former CEO of Comcast.
- Raymond Smith – Retired rear admiral and former deputy commander of United States Special Operations Command. Former commanding officer of SEAL Delivery Vehicle Team One and director of Basic Underwater Demolition/SEAL (BUD/S) training from 1981 to 1983. Graduate of the United States Naval Academy. Graduated BUD/S in 1970 and served as a platoon commander during Vietnam War.
- Seth Stone – Commander and recipient of two silver stars. Died in a parachuting accident.
- Tim Szymanski – Retired vice admiral and former commanding officer of SEAL Team Two and Naval Special Warfare Group Two. Former troop, squadron commander, operations officer and deputy commanding officer of DEVGRU. Graduate of the United States Naval Academy. Former Commanding Officer, Naval Special Warfare Command (2016–2018).
- Scott Taylor – Member of the House of Representatives for Virginia's 2nd congressional district.
- Michael E. Thornton – Medal of Honor recipient from the Vietnam War, founding member of DEVGRU.
- Mike Troy – Two-time Olympic gold medalist and former world record-holder. Received Silver Star during the Vietnam War.
- Derrick Van Orden – Member of the House of Representatives for Wisconsin's 3rd congressional district.
- Peter Vasely – Rear admiral, served as assistant to the Director of the Navy Staff
- Jesse Ventura – Born James George Janos. Former pro wrestler, governor of Minnesota.
- Howard E. Wasdin – Author of SEAL Team Six: Memoirs of an Elite Navy Sniper and former member of DEVGRU. Veteran of The First Battle of Mogadishu in Somalia.
- Brandon Webb – SEAL sniper instructor and author.
- Jocko Willink – Received the Silver Star and Bronze Star for his actions in the Iraq War. Willink was commander of SEAL Team Three's Task Unit Bruiser during the 2006 Battle of Ramadi. Author of the book Extreme Ownership along with fellow SEAL Leif Babin. Hosts a weekly podcast, The Jocko Podcast, with friend and fellow Brazilian jiu-jitsu practitioner, Echo Charles. Founded the leadership consulting company, Echelon Front, with Babin.
- Edward G. Winters III – Retired rear admiral and former commanding officer of the Naval Special Warfare Development Group (2003–2005) and Naval Special Warfare Command (2008–2011).
- Brandon Wolff – Former American mixed martial artist. His twin brother, Brenton, is also a SEAL and a former mixed martial artist.
- Ryan Zinke – Retired Navy commander and former member of DEVGRU; member of the House of Representatives for Montana's at-large congressional district and Montana's 1st congressional district; former Secretary of the Interior (2017–2019).

== See also ==
- List of Delta Force members – US Army special operations force members
