= Kevin Lacz =

United States Navy sailor (born 1981)

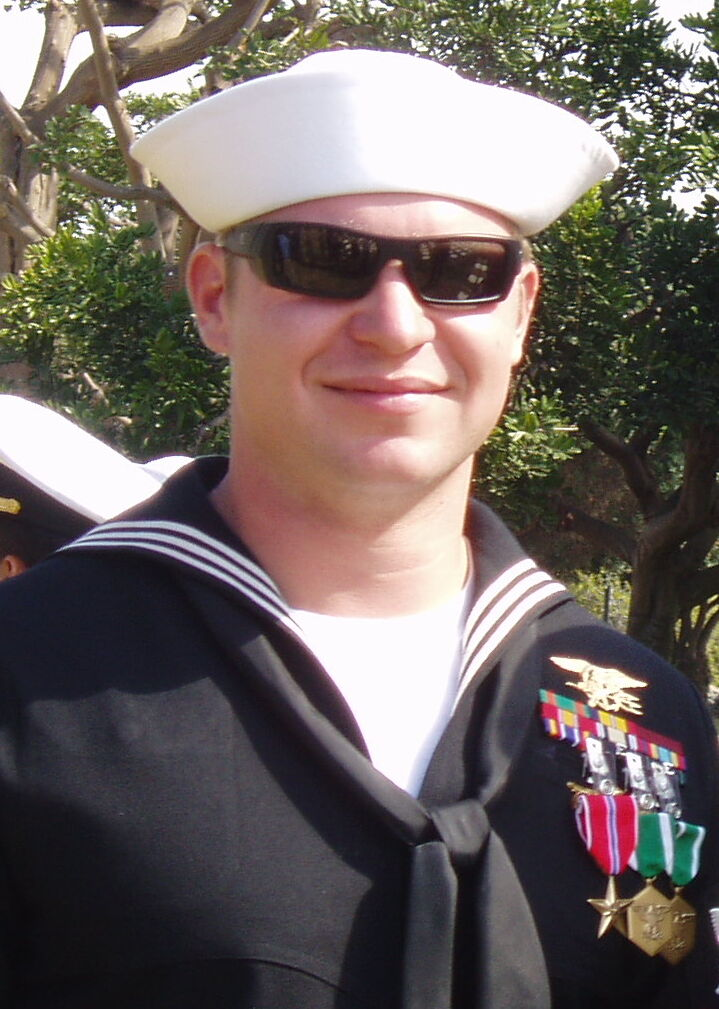
- Lacz at a SEAL Team 3 awards ceremony in Coronado, CA, on October 7, 2007
- Born: December 26, 1981 (age 44); Meriden, Connecticut, U.S.
- Spouse: Lindsey Lacz (m. 2009)
- Relatives: Peter Lacz (father); Marlene Lacz (mother); Mark Lacz (brother); Michael Lacz (brother)
- Military career
- Allegiance: United States
- Branch: United States Navy
- Service years: 2002–2010
- Rank: Petty officer first class
- Nickname: "Dauber"
- Unit: SEAL Team 3
- Conflicts: Iraq War; Battle of Ramadi; 2008 Iraq spring fighting
- Awards: Bronze Star Medal; Navy and Marine Corps Commendation Medal (2); Navy and Marine Corps Achievement Medal (2)
- Other work: The Last Punisher (2016)

Kevin "Dauber" Lacz (born December 26, 1981) is a United States Navy SEAL veteran who served two tours in the Iraq War. His platoon's 2006 deployment to Ramadi has been discussed in several books, including Dick Couch's The Sheriff of Ramadi, Jim DeFelice's Code Name: Johnny Walker, Jocko Willink and Leif Babin's Extreme Ownership: How U.S. Navy Seals Lead and Win and Chris Kyle's New York Times best-selling autobiography, American Sniper. Lacz's presence in the book led to his involvement in the production of and eventual casting in the Clint Eastwood-directed Oscar-winning biopic of the same name (starring Bradley Cooper). He is currently facing charges for capturing and tying up an American alligator from a full-fenced pond, taking it back to his house, and killing it by drilling a power drill through its skull.

== Early life ==
Lacz was born in Meriden, Connecticut, where he lived until the age of 12, at which point he moved to Middlefield, Connecticut. He attended Xavier High School in Middletown, Connecticut, an all-male private Catholic school, graduating in 2000. He enrolled at James Madison University in 2000 to pursue a career in medicine.

== Military career ==
When the terrorist attacks of September 11, 2001 claimed the life of a friend's father, Lacz decided to leave school in favor of the military. A SEALs poster on the wall at a navy recruiter's office inspired Lacz to enlist in the United States Navy with orders for Basic Underwater Demolition SEAL school (BUD/S).

Lacz started BUD/S Class 245, but suffered a back injury that forced him to roll back to the next class. He went on to graduate with BUD/S Class 246 in 2003. As a Hospital Corpsman, Lacz also attended 18-D Special Operations Combat Medic School at Fort Bragg before checking into SEAL Team 3 in Coronado, California. Soon after, he attended Army Sniper School and returned to Charlie Platoon where he began preparing for his 2006 deployment with Chris Kyle, Jonny Kim, Marc Alan Lee, Ryan Job, Jocko Willink and Mike Monsoor (who was in the same Task Unit, but from Delta Platoon).

In 2006, Lacz deployed to Ramadi, Iraq, with Charlie Platoon, Task Unit Bruiser, which became the most highly decorated special operations unit of the Iraq War. For his actions on his 2006 deployment, Lacz was awarded a Bronze Star Medal with a Combat 'V.'

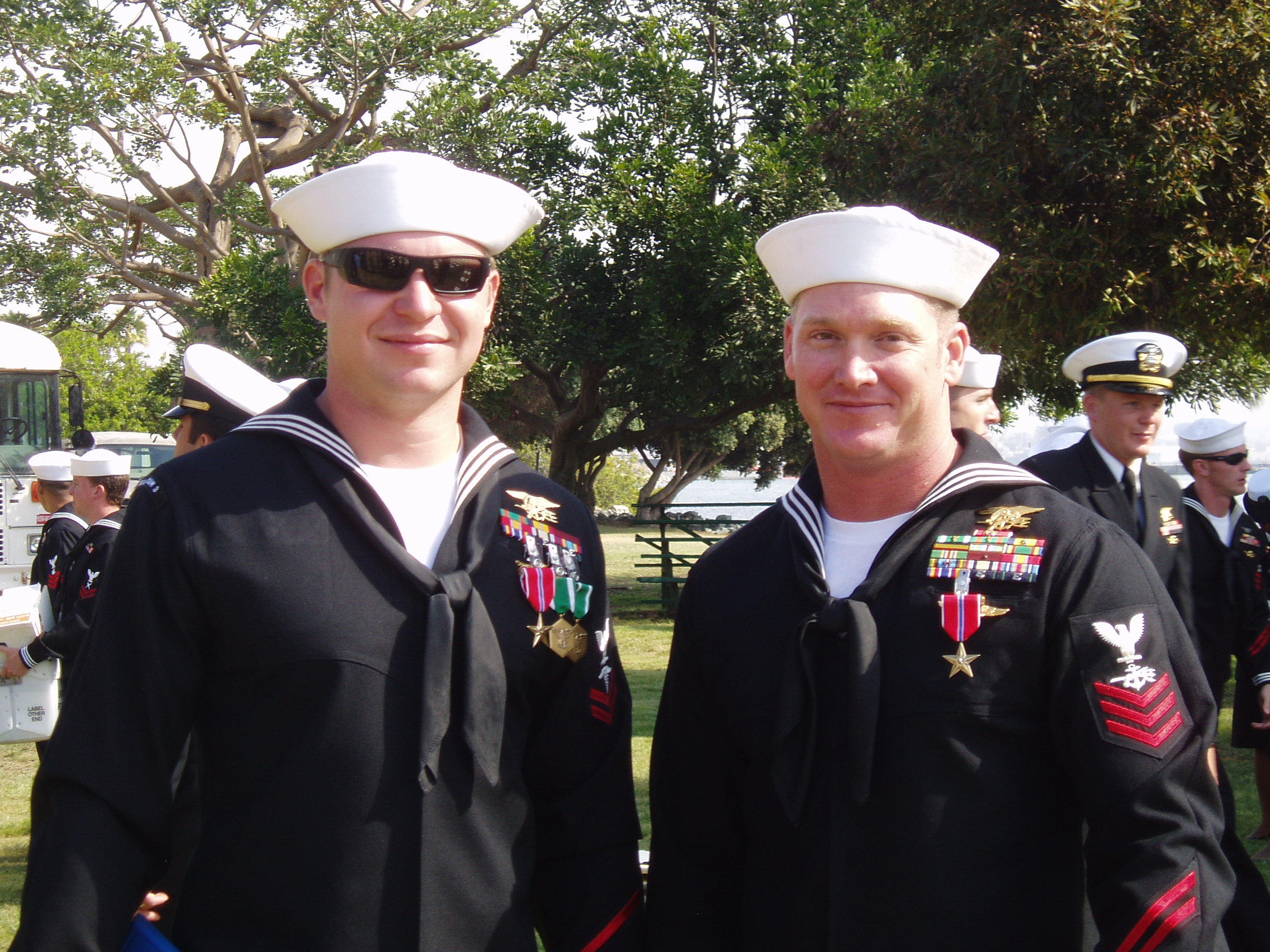
Kevin Lacz and Chris Kyle at a SEAL Team 3 awards ceremony in Coronado, CA, on October 7, 2007

In 2008, Lacz returned to Iraq, joining Chris Kyle for another deployment focusing on the border with Syria and the interception of foreign fighters trying to infiltrate the country.

In addition to his Bronze Star Medal, Lacz was awarded two Navy and Marine Corps Commendation Medals and two Navy and Marine Corps Achievement Medals, among other awards.

== Post-military life ==
Upon completing his enlistment, Lacz was honorably discharged from the Navy. He returned to Connecticut and enrolled at the University of Connecticut with the intention of continuing his career in medicine. He graduated magna cum laude with a degree in political science in 2011 and began the application process for physician assistant school. In 2012, Lacz moved his family to Winston-Salem, North Carolina to pursue his Masters of Medical Sciences at Wake Forest University. He graduated in August 2014.

Because of his close working and personal relationship with Chris Kyle, Lacz was asked to contribute to his autobiography, American Sniper, through interviews. Kyle also discussed Lacz frequently when referencing the 2006 and 2008 deployments (as "Dauber"), laying the groundwork for Lacz's involvement in the production. He was hired to provide SEAL technical advising for the film. Bradley Cooper also convinced Clint Eastwood to allow Lacz to audition for the role of "Dauber," after which he was cast to play himself.

Lacz is the spokesperson for Hunting for Healing, a 501(c)(3) charitable organization he founded with his wife, Lindsey.

Lacz was appointed by Governor Rick Scott of Florida to the District Board of Trustees for Pensacola State College in 2015. Lacz is also a professional speaker represented by Greater Talent Network (GTN). His memoir about his 2006 deployment to Ramadi, The Last Punisher, was published on July 12, 2016.

Currently, Lacz works as a physician assistant in northwest Florida and southeastern Alabama, where he is co-owner of Regenesis, a lifestyle and performance medicine medical practice.

In 2026, the Florida Fish and Wildlife Conservation Commission reported that Lacz along with Richard Reder and Jason Griffin were charged with second-degree misdemeanor “conservation” charges for killing a federally protected American alligator with a long power drill for which there is unquestionable photographic evidence

== Awards and decorations ==
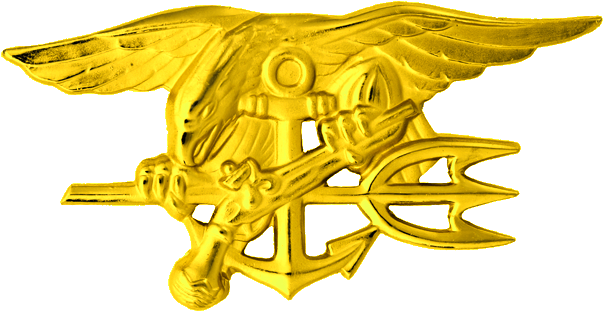
