= Jocko Willink =

Retired United States Navy SEAL (born 1971)

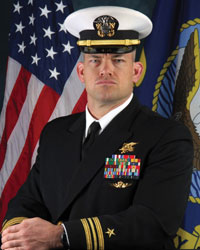
- Willink in 2017
- Born: John Gretton Willink, Jr. September 8, 1971 (age 55); Torrington, Connecticut, U.S.
- Alma mater: University of San Diego (BA)
- Military career
- Allegiance: United States
- Branch: United States Navy
- Service years: 1990–2010
- Rank: Lieutenant commander
- Units: SEAL Team 1 SEAL Team 2 SEAL Team 3 SEAL Team 7
- Conflicts: Iraq War; Battle of Ramadi
- Awards: Silver Star; Bronze Star Medal; Meritorious Service Medal
- Website: jockopodcast.com

John Gretton "Jocko" Willink Jr. (born September 8, 1971) is an American author, podcaster, and retired United States Navy SEALs officer. He is also on the board of directors for the Major League Soccer club San Diego FC.

Willink's military service includes combat actions in the Iraq War, where he commanded SEAL Team 3's Task Unit Bruiser, the unit that fought in the battle against the Iraqi insurgents in Ramadi. Willink received the Silver Star and Bronze Star Medal for his service and achieved the rank of lieutenant commander.

Willink co-authored the books Extreme Ownership and The Dichotomy of Leadership (with fellow retired SEAL Leif Babin) and co-founded the management consulting firm Echelon Front, LLC. Willink hosts a weekly podcast with Brazilian jiu-jitsu practitioner Echo Charles, called the Jocko Podcast.

== Early life ==
John Gretton Willink Jr. was born on September 8, 1971, in Torrington, Connecticut. He has two siblings. He played soccer in high school and holds a B.A. in English from the University of San Diego.

== Military career ==
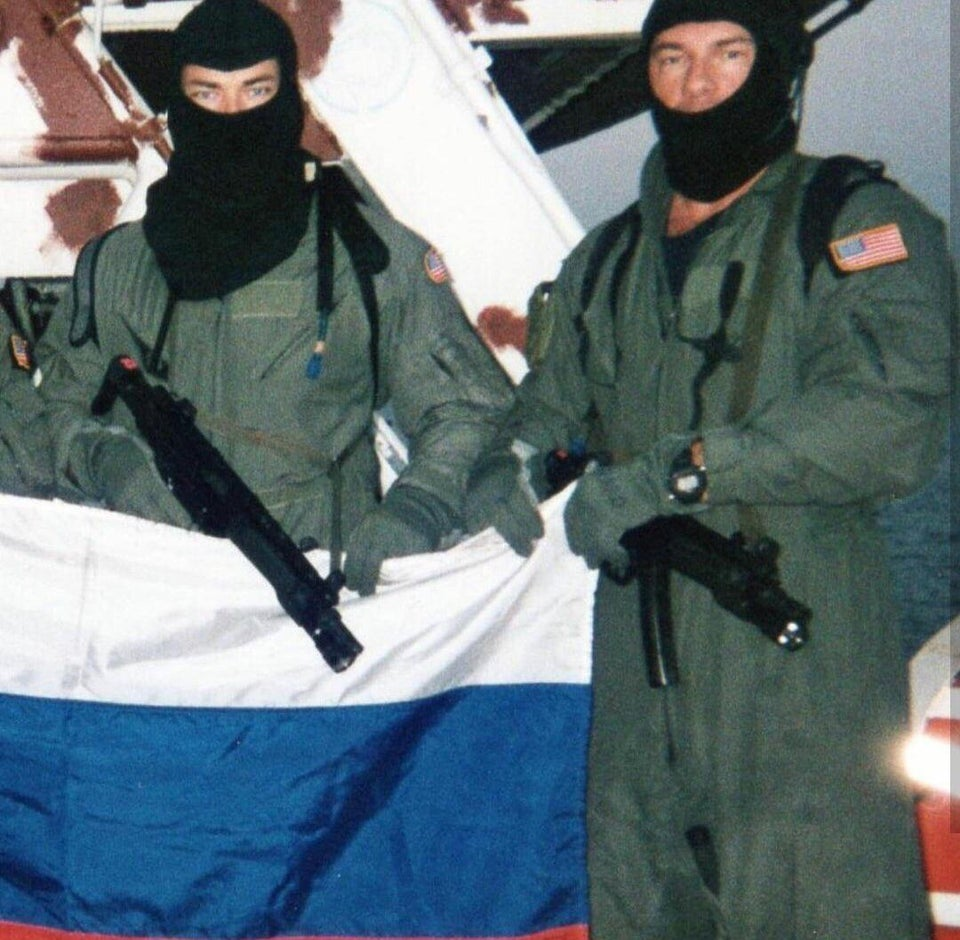
Jocko Willink (left) and Thomas Dzieran after a boarding operation on Russian oil tanker Volga-Neft-147

Willink wanted to be in the military from an early age, and he enlisted in the United States Navy at the age of 19. After Navy recruit training and Radioman (RM) "A" School training, Willink reported to Basic Underwater Demolition/SEAL training (BUD/S) training at Naval Amphibious Base Coronado. Willink graduated BUD/S class 177. Following SEAL tactical training (STT) and completion of six-month probationary period, he received his trident insignia. Willink served eight years on active duty as an enlisted Navy SEAL with SEAL Team One.

Willink earned his commission via Officer Candidate School and served with SEAL Team Two and later SEAL Team Seven as a platoon commander. Willink earned a degree from University of San Diego in 2003. Willink completed multiple deployments to Asia, the Middle East and Europe. Willink was part of the SEAL team that seized the Russian Tanker Volga-Neft-147 in the Gulf of Oman, which was carrying Iraqi oil in violation of a United Nations economic embargo.

During Operation Iraqi Freedom he deployed to the Iraqi city of Ramadi in 2006 with SEAL Team Three as commander of Task Unit Bruiser, which included Leif Babin, Seth "Stoner" Stone, Marc Alan Lee, Michael Monsoor, Jonny Kim, Kevin Lacz, Ryan "Biggles" Job, JP Dinnell, Tony Eafrati, Jason Hogan and Chris Kyle.

Willink also served as a Navy SEAL instructor during his career. He retired in October 2010 after 20 years of service.

== Post-Navy career ==
After retiring from the Navy, Willink co-founded the leadership consulting firm Echelon Front along with Leif Babin, who served with him in the SEAL Teams. The firm hosts conferences and seminars to teach leadership skills. He and Babin also co-authored the leadership manual Extreme Ownership: How U.S. Navy Seals Lead and Win.

In addition to his work in consulting and authorship, Willink instructs jiu-jitsu at Victory MMA & Fitness in San Diego and co-owns Origin USA, a company based in Farmington, Maine, which produces lifestyle apparel, nutrition supplements, and fitness equipment, as well as being one of the only manufacturers of jiu-jitsu gis in the United States. Willink has a chapter giving advice in Tim Ferriss' book Tools of Titans.

=== Brazilian jiu-jitsu career ===
Willink started practicing Brazilian jiu-jitsu under Fabio Santos while in active service, and continued training after retirement from the military. He obtained his black belt from the well-known MMA fighter and grappler Dean Lister. Since then, Willink has been a prominent figure in the sport, has competed against big names such as Jeff Monson and has taught many grapplers. Willink promoted his own daughter to blue belt in Brazilian jiu-jitsu in September 2022.

=== Writing ===
Willink has authored numerous fiction and nonfiction books. His 2015 book Extreme Ownership reached #13 in the audio nonfiction category of the New York Times best-seller list. The book describes leadership lessons using examples of real-world missions and combat encounters. In 2017, he published Discipline Equals Freedom: Field Manual, a collection of healthy living routines and mindsets for productivity.

He authored the children's book series the Way of the Warrior Kid, which is intended to present the life lessons Willink received from SEAL training in a way that is digestible and applicable for children. As of April 2024, Way of the Warrior Kid was reportedly being adapted into a feature film starring Chris Pratt and scripted by Will Staples.

=== Podcast ===
After appearing on the podcasts of Tim Ferriss, Joe Rogan, and Sam Harris to publicize one of his books, Willink decided to start his own weekly podcast, The Jocko Podcast. On December 28, 2015, Willink launched the podcast on YouTube, with an accompanying website. As of January 2026, his YouTube channel has about two million subscribers. Willink films the podcast at the Victory MMA & Fitness studio in San Diego.

== Bibliography ==
=== Adult nonfiction ===
- Extreme Ownership: How U.S. Navy Seals Lead and Win (2015) (ISBN 978-1-76055-820-8)
- Discipline Equals Freedom: Field Manual (2017) (ISBN 978-1-250-15694-5)
- The Dichotomy of Leadership: Balancing the Challenges of Extreme Ownership to Lead and Win (2018) (ISBN 978-1-250-19577-7)
- Leadership Strategy and Tactics: Field Manual (2020) (ISBN 978-1-250-22684-6)
- The Code. The Evaluation. The Protocols: Striving to Become an Eminently Qualified Human (2020) (ISBN 978-0-9816188-2-1)

=== Adult fiction ===
- Final Spin: A Novel (2021) (ISBN 978-1250276858)

=== Children's books ===
- Mikey and the Dragons (2018) (ISBN 978-1-942549-43-7)

==== Way of the Warrior Kid (2017–22) ====
1. The Way of the Warrior Kid (2017) (ISBN 978-1-250-15107-0)
2. Marc's Mission: Way of the Warrior Kid (2018) (ISBN 978-1-250-15679-2)
3. Way of the Warrior Kid 3: Where there's a Will... (2019) (ISBN 978-1-942549-48-2)
4. Way of the Warrior Kid 4: Field Manual (2020) (ISBN 978-1942549666)
5. Way of the Warrior Kid 5: Letters from Uncle Jake (2022) (ISBN 978-0981618890)

== Awards and decorations ==
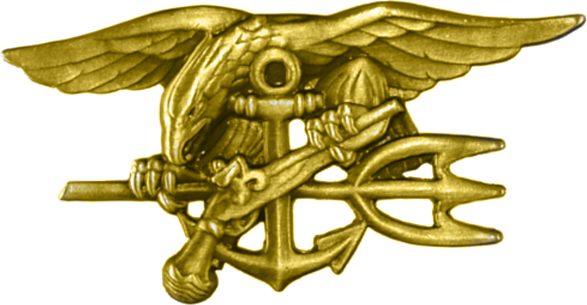

Badge	Special Warfare insignia		
1st row	Silver Star	Bronze Star with "V" device	Meritorious Service Medal
2nd row	Navy and Marine Corps Commendation Medal with 1 Gold 5/16-inch star (two awards)	Navy and Marine Corps Achievement Medal with 4 Gold 5/16-inch stars (five awards)	Combat Action Ribbon
3rd row	Navy Unit Commendation with 2 Service stars (three awards)	Navy Meritorious Unit Commendation	Battle Efficiency Award
4th row	Navy Good Conduct Medal with 2 Service stars (three awards)	Navy Fleet Marine Force Ribbon	National Defense Service Medal with 1 Service star (two awards)
5th row	Armed Forces Expeditionary Medal with 1 Service star (two awards)	Southwest Asia Service Medal with 1 Service star (two awards)	Iraq Campaign Medal with 3 Campaign stars (four campaigns)
6th row	Global War on Terrorism Expeditionary Medal	Global War on Terrorism Service Medal	Humanitarian Service Medal
7th row	Navy and Marine Corps Sea Service Deployment Ribbon with 4 Service stars (five awards)	Rifle Marksmanship Medal with Expert Device	Pistol Marksmanship Medal with Expert Device
Badge	Navy and Marine Corps Parachutist Badge		

== See also ==
- List of United States Navy SEALs
