= Ryan Job =

United States Navy SEAL (1981–2009)

Ryan Curtis Job
- Job in Iraq
- Born: March 11, 1981; Issaquah, Washington, United States
- Died: September 24, 2009 (aged 28); Phoenix, Arizona, United States
- Spouse: Kelly Lester
- Children: 1
- Relatives: Chris Kyle, Marc Alan Lee, Kevin Lacz
- Military career
- Allegiance: United States
- Branch: United States Navy
- Service years: 2002–2007
- Rank: Petty officer second class (E5)
- Nickname: Biggles
- Units: United States Navy SEALs; SEAL Team Three
- Conflicts: War on terrorism; Iraq War; Battle of Ramadi
- Awards: Silver Star; Bronze Star Medal (with "V" device); Purple Heart; Navy and Marine Corps Commendation Medal (with "V" device); Navy and Marine Corps Achievement Medal (with "V" device); Good Conduct Medal

Ryan Curtis Job (pronounced "Jobe") (March 11, 1981 – September 24, 2009), also known by his nickname "Biggles", was an American sailor and member of the United States Navy SEALs who was shot during a combat mission in Ramadi, Iraq, during the Second Battle of Ramadi. He survived the attack, but later died in an incident of medical malpractice, leading to a $4 million (2011 USD) lawsuit.

Job's shooting was described by Chris Kyle in his 2013 book American Sniper, and he was portrayed by Jake McDorman in the film of the same name.

== Life and military career ==
Job was born on March 11, 1981, in Issaquah, Washington; he had two younger siblings, including Aaron Job, who became a Marine. After graduating from Issaquah High School, he attended the University of Washington in the late 1990s, and from there enlisted in the United States Navy. He began basic training on December 17, 2002, and completed it at Naval Station Great Lakes in February 2003. He later attended Basic Underwater Demolition/SEAL training (BUD/S) at Naval Amphibious Base Coronado, and then underwent specialized SEAL training from May 2003 to November 2004. After completing Naval Special Warfare Advanced Training in June 2005, Job served with SEAL Team Three at Naval Amphibious Base Coronado from June 2005 until he was medically retired from the Navy on March 31, 2007.

=== Injury and later life ===
On August 2, 2006, Job suffered an injury as a result of a bullet ricocheting off of his gun into his face while on an overwatch mission with fellow SEAL members Chris Kyle and Marc Alan Lee in Ramadi, Iraq. A bullet fired by an enemy gunman ricocheted off Job's Mk 48 machine gun and struck him in the left side of his face; the bullet went through his head and left him permanently blind. Lee covered fire with an M60 machine gun while Kyle and fellow SEAL team member Jonny Kim worked to carry Job down the steps of the building they were in. Lee was shot and killed as Kyle, Job and others evacuated the building. Job was sent to Germany for treatment of his injuries, and then transported to the United States.

Job moved in 2007 to Scottsdale, Arizona, where he completed his degree in business administration through online study. He interned with General Dynamics, who offered him a position. He became a spokesman for the Sentinels of Freedom Scholarship Foundation, an organization assisting injured veterans that had facilitated his move. In July 2008, he climbed Mount Rainier with two other veterans injured in Iraq. He also trained for a triathlon.

== Personal life and death ==
In 2007 Job married Kelly Lester, a nurse. They have a daughter, born after his death.

Job died on September 24, 2009, after undergoing further treatment for his eye injuries at the Maricopa County Medical Center in Phoenix, Arizona; it was later determined that he was administered a fatal combination of drugs. A judge determined that his death was an incident of medical malpractice, and Maricopa County paid Job's family $4 million (2011 USD) to settle a malpractice lawsuit.

== In media ==
Job is a subject of Chris Kyle's 2013 book American Sniper. In the 2014 movie American Sniper he was portrayed by Jake McDorman. In 2015, Robert Vera published A Warrior's Faith, a memoir of his friendship with Job and how Ryan's life transformed so many others.

== See also ==
- List of United States Navy SEALs
