= Jonny Kim =

American astronaut, physician, and former U.S. Navy SEAL (born 1984)

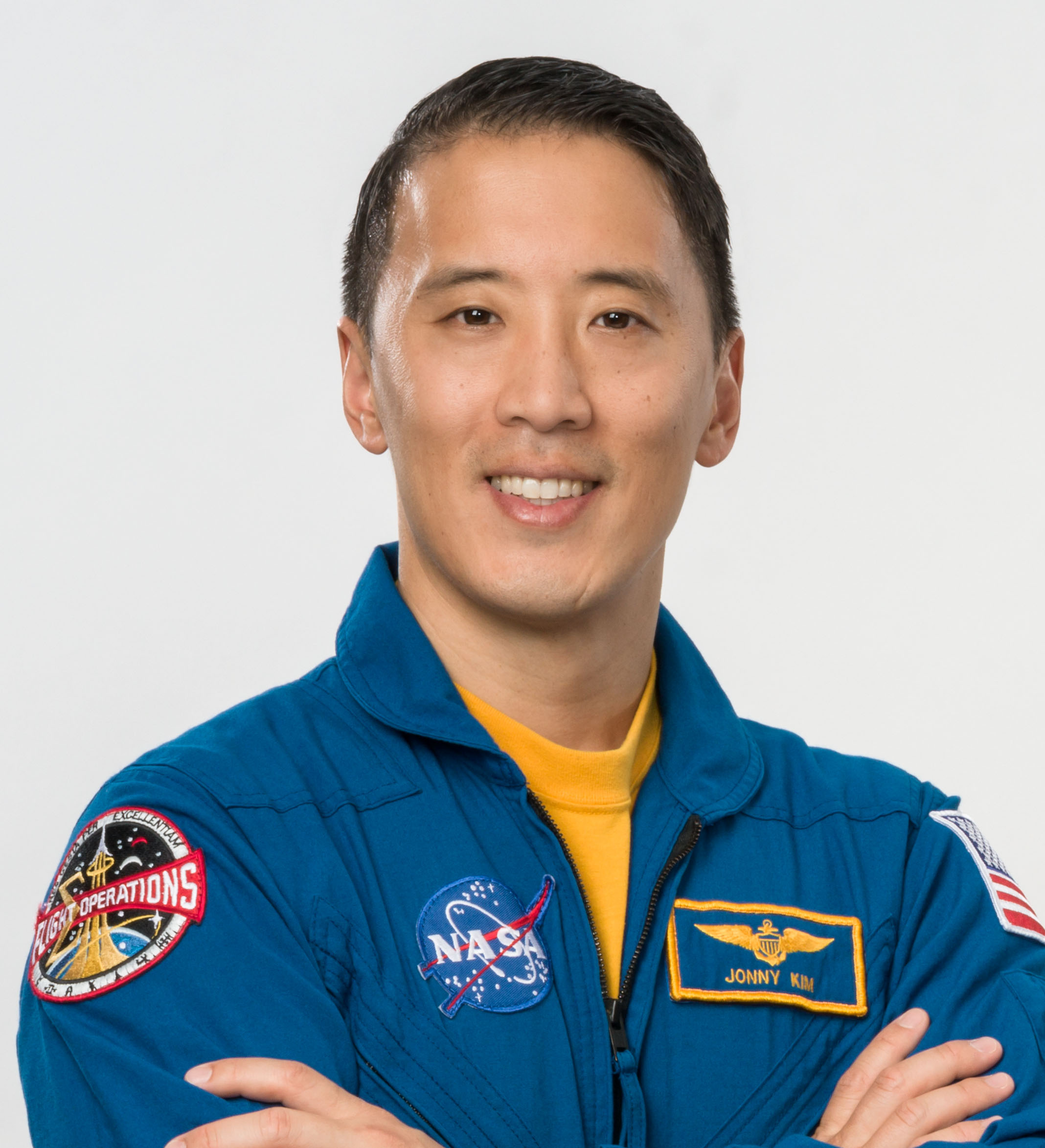
- Kim in 2024
- Born: Jonathan Yong Kim; 5 February 1984 (age 42); Los Angeles, California, U.S.
- Education: University of San Diego (BA); Harvard University (MD)
- Children: 3
- Space career

NASA astronaut
- Time in space: 244 days, 23 hours, 16 minutes
- Selection: NASA Group 22 (2017)
- Mission: Soyuz MS-27 (Expedition 72/73)
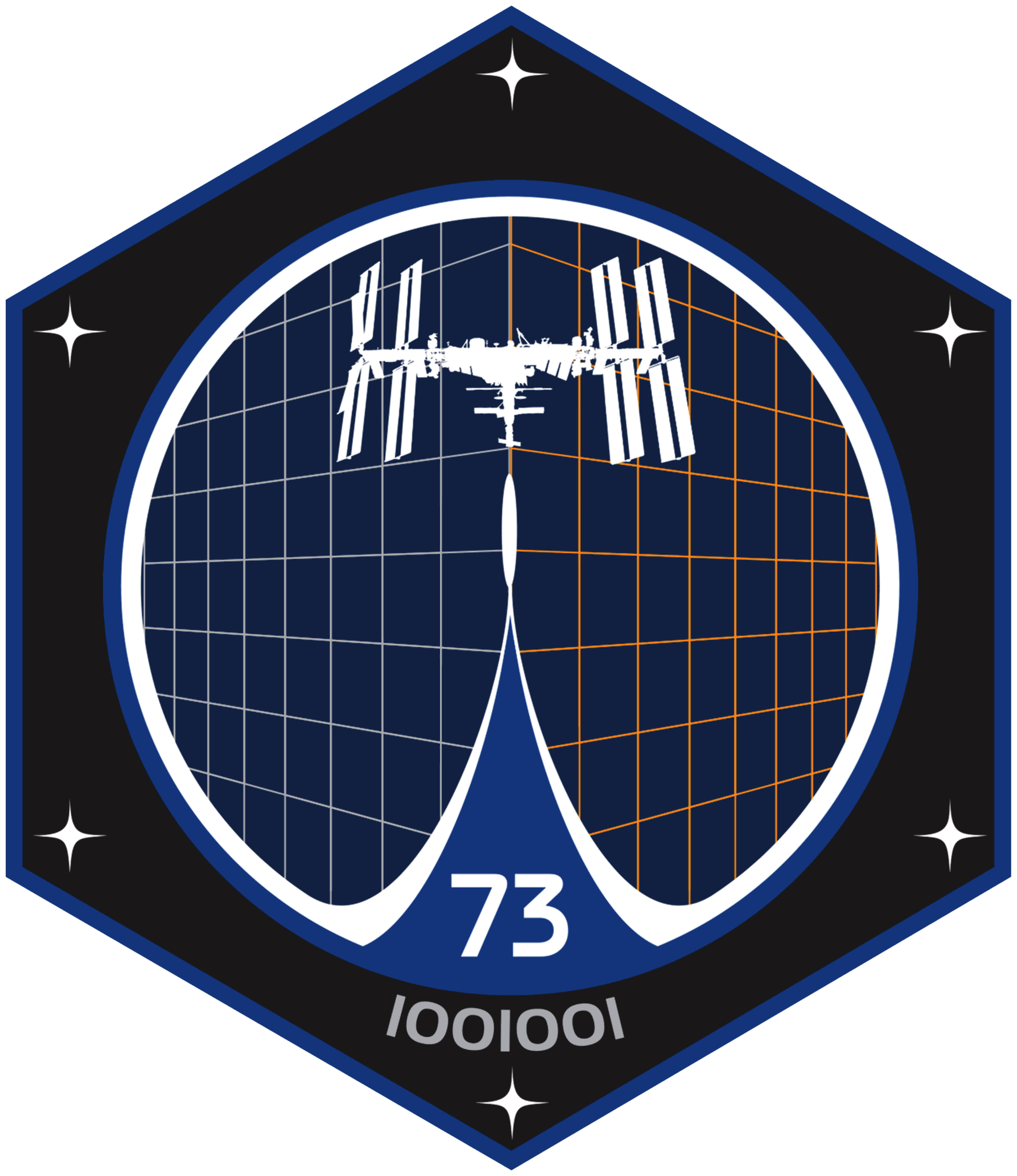
- Mission insignia
- Retired: August 27, 2026
- Military career
- Branch: United States Navy
- Years: 2002–present
- Rank: Commander
- Units: SEAL Team 3; Navy Medical Corps
- Conflicts: Iraq War
- Awards: Silver Star

Jonathan Yong Kim (born 5 February 1984) is an American physician, U.S. naval officer, Navy SEAL, and retired NASA astronaut.

Born in Los Angeles to South Korean immigrants, Kim enlisted in the Navy in 2002. He joined SEAL Team 3 and participated in over 100 combat missions in the Middle East as a combat medic, sniper, navigator, and point man. He has earned a Silver Star and Bronze Star with Combat "V" (for Valor), and achieved the rank of commander. Kim is also an Aerospace Medicine Dual Designator (AMDD); since its inception during World War I, only 79 individuals have earned the dual designation of both physician and naval aviator in the U.S. Navy. In 2017, Kim was selected to join NASA Astronaut Group 22. He launched with Expedition 72/73 to the International Space Station on 8 April 2025 and returned on 9 December 2025.

== Early life and education ==
Jonathan Yong Kim was born on 5 February 1984 in Los Angeles, California. His parents emigrated from South Korea to the United States in the early 1980s, and his father had scarcely completed a high-school education. The family opened a liquor store in South Los Angeles, and his mother worked as a substitute elementary school teacher while raising Kim and his younger brother. In a 2018 interview with Annals of Emergency Medicine, Kim described himself as "the epitome of that quiet kid who just lacked complete self-confidence." In 2020, The Chosun Ilbo reported that the adolescent Kim had been the victim of domestic violence at the hands of his father; in February 2002, after threatening his family with a gun, Kim's father was shot to death in his attic by police.

Kim graduated from Santa Monica High School in 2002 where he received high grades in his classes, including several Advanced Placements, while participating in swimming and water polo. While a member of the Navy, Kim received a Bachelor of Arts, summa cum laude, in mathematics from the University of San Diego in 2012, and a Doctor of Medicine from Harvard Medical School in 2016. Kim was a Pat Tillman Foundation "Tillman Scholar" selectee. In 2017, Kim completed his medical internship in emergency medicine at Massachusetts General Hospital and Brigham and Women's Hospital.

== U.S. Navy service (2002–present) ==
=== U.S. Navy SEAL (2002–2009) ===
Kim learned about and decided to become a Navy SEAL at age 16, investing his remaining high-school years physically conditioning himself for the rigors of Special Warfare training. Of this decision, Kim said, "Going into the Navy was the best decision I ever made in my life because it completely transformed that scared boy who didn't have any dreams to someone who started to believe in himself."

After enlisting with the United States Navy in 2002 as a seaman recruit, Kim graduated BUD/S class 247 and was assigned to SEAL Team 3 with the rating Special Warfare Operator Hospital Corpsman. He deployed twice to the Middle East and participated in over 100 combat missions as a combat medic, sniper, navigator, and point man. During his tenure with the SEALs, Kim served with Marc Alan Lee, Michael A. Monsoor, Jocko Willink, and Chris Kyle.

=== U.S. Navy officer (2009–present) ===
In 2009, Kim was accepted to the Seaman to Admiral commissioning program. When he graduated from the University of San Diego in 2012, Kim then attended Harvard Medical School as part of the Navy's Health Services Collegiate Program and following graduation entered the Medical Corps and trained to become a flight surgeon.

Kim applied to the naval Aeromedical Dual Designator (AMDD) program, as both a flight surgeon and a naval aviator. On 6 June 2022, Kim completed his first solo flight in a Beechcraft T-6 Texan II at the Naval Air Training Command, part of a common training regimen for U.S. Navy – NASA astronauts who lacked previous military pilot experience. After further training on the Northrop T-38 Talon and TH-57 helicopter, Kim formally completed his flight training in March 2023 at Naval Air Station Whiting Field. In addition to completing the Naval Flight Surgeon Course, Kim received the rare Aeromedical Dual Designator (AMDD).

Kim is a recipient of a Silver Star, Bronze Star Medal (with Combat "V"), the Navy and Marine Corps Commendation Medal (with Combat "V"), and Combat Action Ribbon. According to Jocko Willink, Kim's Silver Star was awarded for rescuing multiple wounded Iraqi soldiers in the face of enemy fire. As of August 2026, Kim is a member of the Navy with rank of commander.

== Medical career ==
As a Navy SEAL corpsman during the Iraq War, he was inspired to pursue medicine.

Following his graduation from Harvard with a M.D. in 2016, he began a residency in emergency medicine through the Harvard Affiliated Emergency Medicine Residency (HAEMR) program at the Massachusetts General Hospital and Brigham and Woman’s Hospital and commissioned into the Navy Medical Corps.

During his tenure at Harvard, he met Scott E. Parazynski, a physician and former NASA astronaut, who inspired him to apply for Astronaut Candidacy. Just a year into his residency, on 7 June 2017, Kim was one of twelve candidates chosen from a pool of over 18,300 applicants to join NASA Astronaut Group 22. Prompting him to leave clinical training, he reported for duty on 21 August 2017 and graduated from training on 10 January 2020.

He later completed a year-long postgraduate internship (PGY-1) and attend the Naval Aerospace Medical Institute (NAMI), becoming a naval flight surgeon.

== NASA astronaut (2017–2026) ==
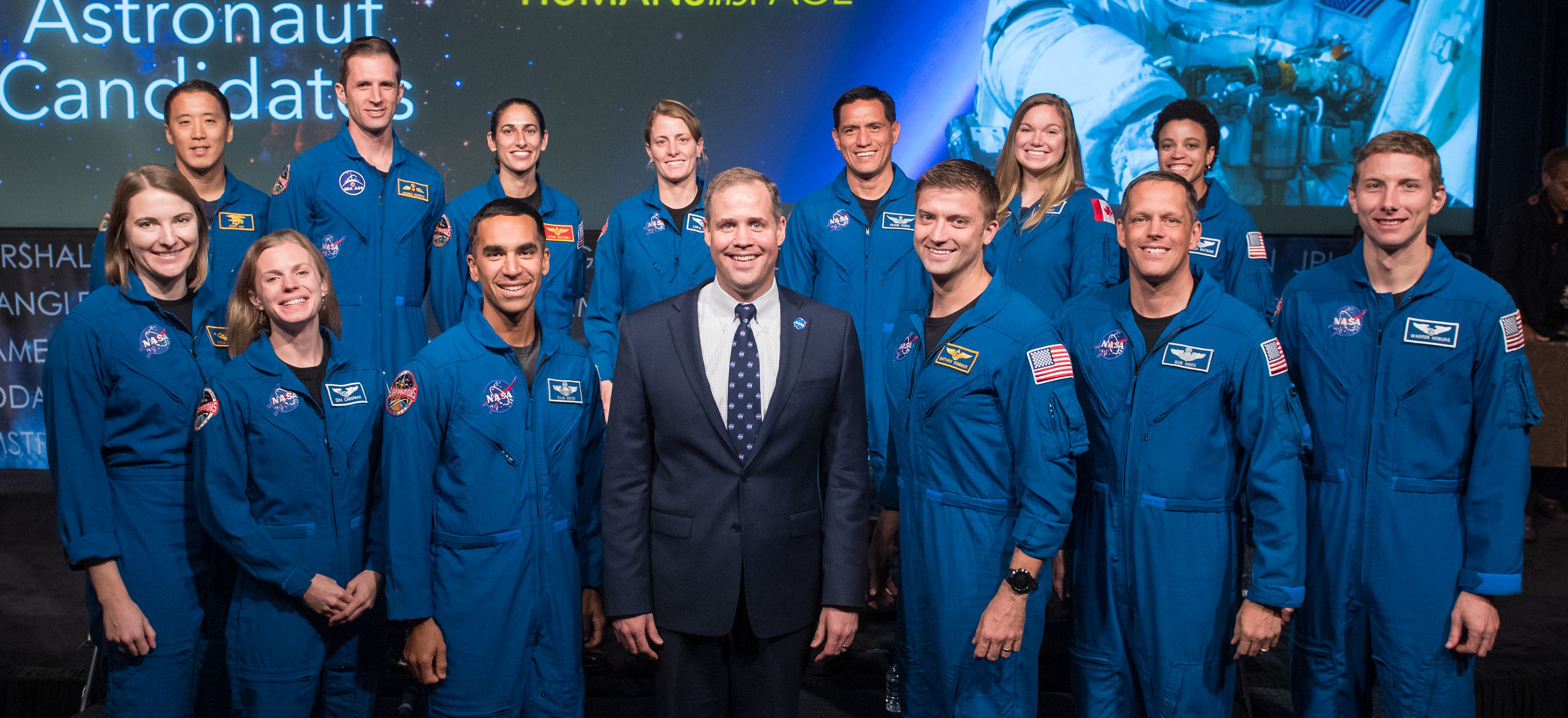
Astronaut Group 22 with NASA administrator Jim Bridenstine (2018). Kim is visible in the upper left corner.

Kim worked in the Astronaut Office while awaiting a flight assignment. In 2020, Kim began working as a capsule communicator at the Christopher C. Kraft Jr. Mission Control Center. On 9 December 2020, NASA formally announced that Kim would join 17 other astronauts in training for early Moon landing missions of the Artemis program. In July 2023, he was serving as operations officer, supporting crew operations. In August 2024, NASA announced that Kim was scheduled as a member of the Expedition 72/73 crew to the International Space Station (ISS).

=== Expedition 72/73 ===
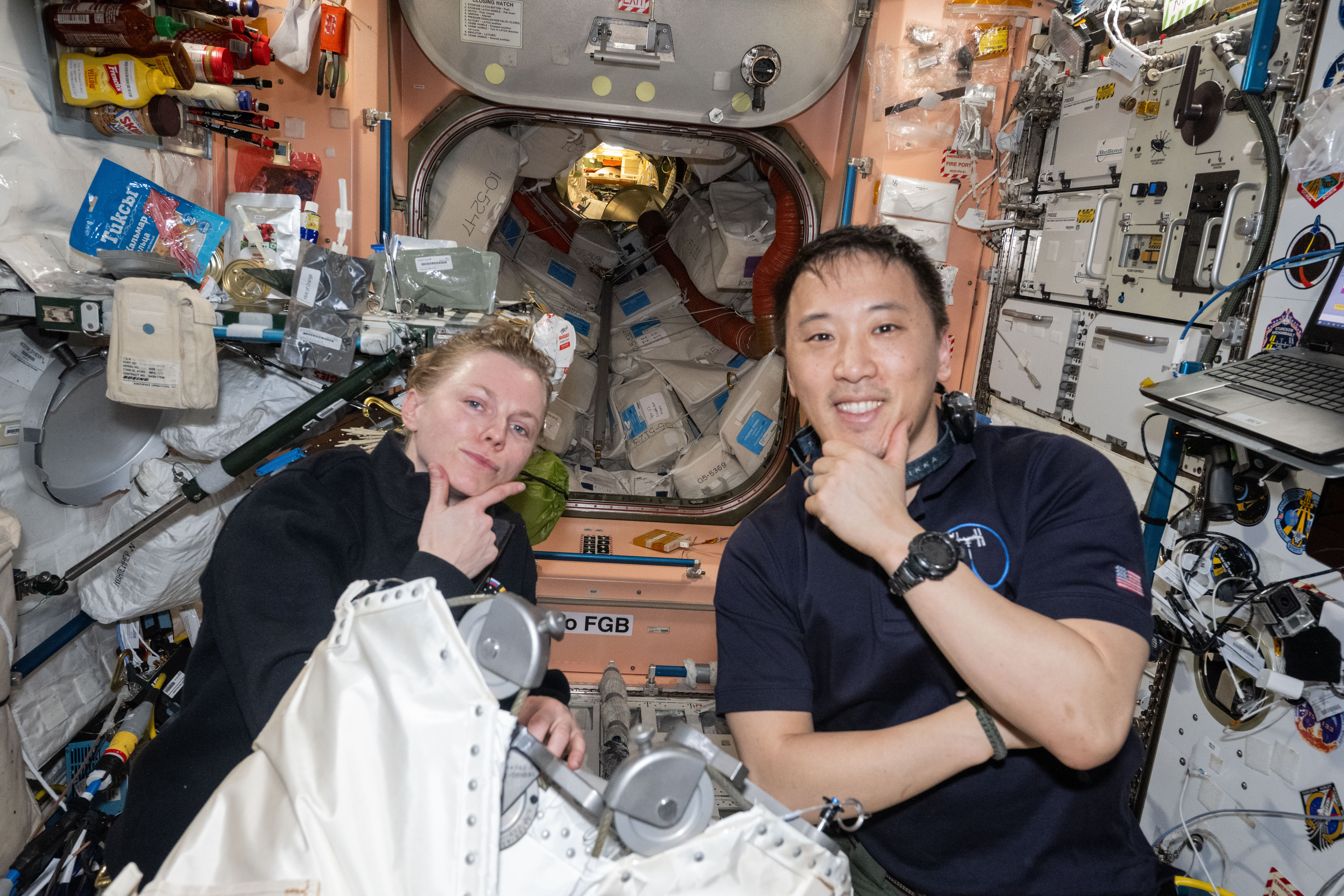
Zena Cardman and Jonny Kim pose in Unity module

The Expedition 72/73 crew—Kim, Sergey Ryzhikov, and Alexey Zubritsky—launched from the Baikonur Cosmodrome, aboard the Soyuz MS-27 spacecraft, on 8 April 2025 at 05:47 UTC; they docked with Prichal three hours and ten minutes later. Kim was tasked to "conduct scientific research in technology development, Earth science, biology, human research, and more." He returned to Earth on 9 December 2025, southeast of Jezkazgan, Kazakhstan.

=== Retirement ===
Kim stepped down from his position at NASA on 27 August 2026 to return to active duty to finish out the remainder of his military career within naval aviation training.

== Personal life ==
Kim is married and has three children. According to his NASA biography, his personal interests include outdoor activities, strength training, video games, and lifelong learning.

In public statements ahead of and after his 2025 spaceflight, Kim has commented on the personal challenges of long-duration missions and time away from his family.

== Awards and decorations ==
As of December 2025, Kim is known to have earned the following decorations.

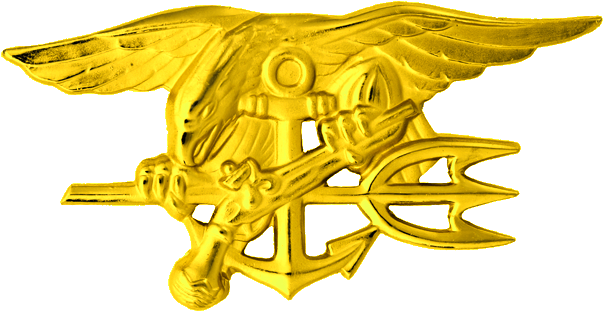

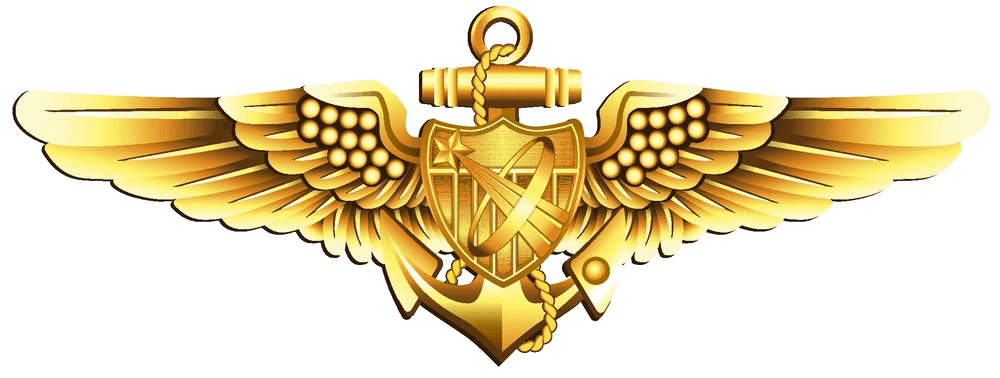

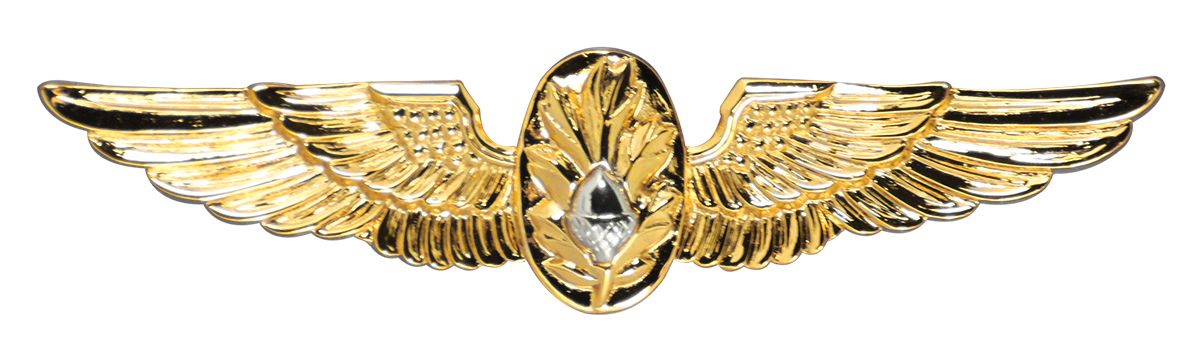

Special Warfare insignia
Naval aviator astronauts badge
Silver Star		Bronze Star Medal with Combat V
Navy and Marine Corps Commendation Medal with Combat V	Combat Action Ribbon	Navy Good Conduct Medal with 2 service stars
National Defense Service Medal	Iraq Campaign Medal with 2 service stars	Global War on Terrorism Service Medal
Sea Service Deployment Ribbon with service star	Navy Expert Rifleman Medal	Navy Expert Pistol Shot Medal
Naval flight surgeon badge
Naval parachutist badge

== See also ==
- List of United States Navy SEALs
