= Luke Grimes =

American actor and musician (born 1984)

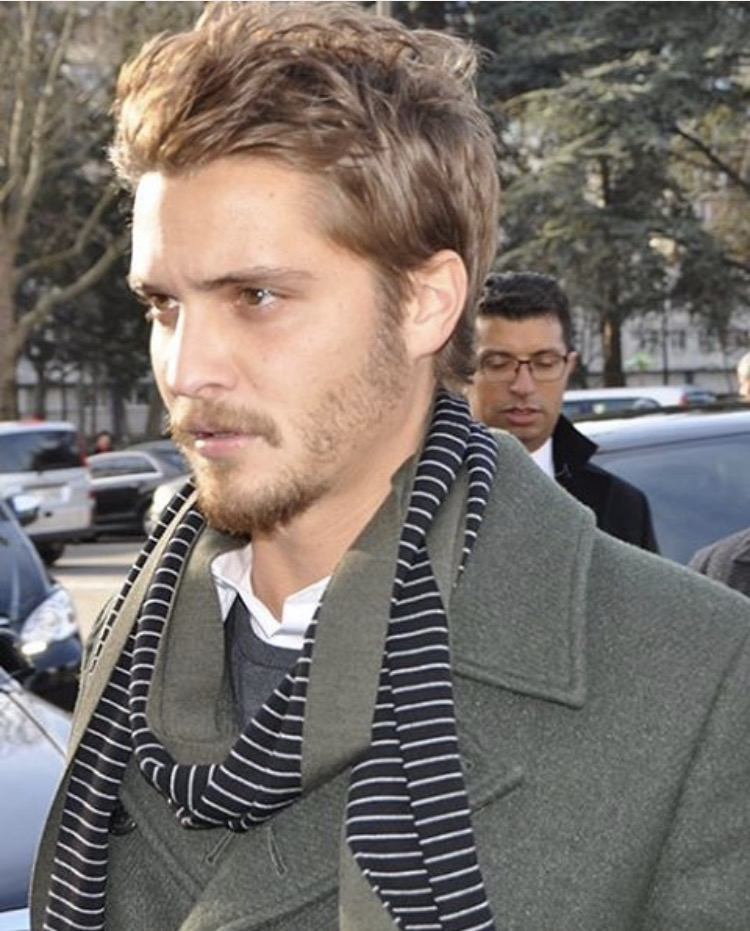
- Grimes in 2014
- Born: Luke Timothy Grimes; January 21, 1984 (age 42); Dayton, Ohio, U.S.
- Occupations: Actor; musician; producer
- Years active: 2006–present
- Spouse: Bianca Rodrigues (m. 2019)
- Children: 1

Luke Timothy Grimes (born January 21, 1984) is an American actor and musician. He is known for his role as Navy SEAL Marc Alan Lee in the film American Sniper. He played Christian Grey's older brother, Elliot, in the film Fifty Shades of Grey (2015), and its sequels, Fifty Shades Darker (2017) and Fifty Shades Freed (2018). He starred as Kayce Dutton in the Paramount Network television series Yellowstone (2018–2024) and in the CBS series Marshals (2026).

== Early life and education ==
Grimes was born in Dayton, Ohio, the son of a Pentecostal pastor. Grimes graduated from Dayton Christian High School in 2002. He moved to New York City to study acting at the American Academy of Dramatic Arts.

== Career ==
Grimes has appeared in All the Boys Love Mandy Lane, War Eagle, Arkansas, and Assassination of a High School President, which received a limited release in March 2009. He appeared in the ABC drama Brothers & Sisters, as Ryan Lafferty, the illegitimate son of William Walker, patriarch of the show's family. Beginning with Season 4, he became a series regular.

He starred in the 2010 FX movie pilot, Outlaw Country, with Haley Bennett and Mary Steenburgen. Grimes played a cowboy named Eli Larkin. The series was not picked up by FX, but the pilot aired on August 23, 2012 as a television movie. In 2012, he appeared in the Liam Neeson thriller Taken 2 as Neeson's daughter's boyfriend.

Grimes portrayed vampire James Kent in True Blood for six episodes during the show's sixth season, but later left the show and was replaced by Nathan Parsons. Reports, confirmed by BuzzFeed, indicated that he quit because he refused to participate in same-sex kissing or sex scenes or to play a character who was attracted to men. Grimes' publicist stated that he departed to pursue other opportunities.

Grimes played United States Navy SEAL Marc Lee, who was killed in action in 2006, in American Sniper (2014). He played Christian Grey's brother, Elliot, in the film Fifty Shades of Grey (2015), and its sequels, Fifty Shades Darker (2017) and Fifty Shades Freed (2018). Grimes played Todd Belkin in Freeheld (2015). From 2018 to 2024, he starred alongside Kevin Costner in the Paramount Network drama series Yellowstone in the role of Kayce Dutton.

== Personal life ==
Grimes married Brazilian model Bianca Rodrigues Grimes in November 2019, and the couple had their first child, a son, Rigel Randolph Grimes in fall 2024. He moved with his family to the Bitterroot Valley of southwestern Montana in 2020.

== Music ==
In January 2024, Grimes released "Burn – Live from Nashville" on Spotify.

On March 8, 2024, Grimes released his self-titled debut album, Luke Grimes.

On April 3, 2026, Grimes released his second album, RedBird. The song “Haunted” was featured on episode one of Marshals.

== Filmography ==
=== Film ===
Year	Title	Role	Notes
2006	All the Boys Love Mandy Lane	Jake	
2007	War Eagle, Arkansas	Enoch	
2008	Assassination of a High School President	Marlon Piazza	
2010	Shit Year	Harvey West	
2011	The Wait	Ben	
2011	The Light in the Night	Boy	Short film
2012	Taken 2	Jamie	
2013	Stars	Evan	
2014	Squatters	Michael Silverman	Direct to video
2014	American Sniper	Marc Lee	
2015	Fifty Shades of Grey	Elliot Grey	
2015	Shangri-La Suite	Jack Blueblood	
2015	Freeheld	Todd Belkin	
2015	Forever	Charlie	
2016	Manhattan Undying	Max	
2016	The Magnificent Seven	Teddy Q	
2017	Fifty Shades Darker	Elliot Grey	
2017	El Camino Christmas	Eric Roth	
2018	Fifty Shades Freed	Elliot Grey	
2019	Into the Ashes	Nick Brenner	
2023	Happiness for Beginners	Jake	
2025	Eddington	Guy	

=== Television ===
Year	Title	Role	Notes
2009–2010	Brothers & Sisters	Ryan Lafferty	Guest (season 3); Main cast (season 4); 35 episodes
2012	Outlaw Country	Eli Larken	TV movie
2013	True Blood	James	6 episodes
2018–24	Yellowstone	Kayce Dutton	Main role Nominated: Screen Actors Guild Award for Outstanding Performance by an Ensemble in a Drama Series
2026	Marshals	Kayce Dutton	Main role also Executive Producer

=== Music videos ===
Year	Song	Artist
2026	Choosin' Texas	Ella Langley

== Discography ==
- Luke Grimes (2024)
- Red Bird (2026)
