= War Eagle, Arkansas (film) =

- Directed by: Robert Milazzo
- Starring: Dan McCabe; Luke Grimes
- Release date: 2007
- Running time: 1h 34min
- Country: USA
- Language: English

War Eagle, Arkansas is a feature film based on two real-life friends, Tim Ballany and Vincent Insalaco III, growing up together in Arkansas and facing a crossroads in life as they graduate from high school.

== Cast ==
- Dan McCabe as Sam "Wheels" Macon (based on Tim Ballany, who has cerebral palsy).
- Luke Grimes as Enoch, a troubled teen who excels at baseball but struggles with stuttering and confidence problems (based on Vincent Insalaco III).
- Brian Dennehy as Pop, Enoch's grandfather.
- Mary Kay Place as Wheels's mother.
- Mare Winningham as Belle, Enoch's mother.
- James McDaniel as Jack, a video store manager.
- Misti Traya as Abby, Enoch's girlfriend.

== Production ==
The film was shot entirely in Northwest Arkansas, primarily in Eureka Springs, Huntsville and Fayetteville and has won over 20 independent film festival awards, including Best Picture and Best Actor at major festivals such as the Breckenridge Film Festival, the Hollywood Film Festival and California Independent Film Festival. The film's budget was a modest $1.1 million, and was provided by Executive Producer Vincent Insalaco Sr. and a group of private investors. Of additional benefit to the film was a grant from Panavision, under a new filmmaker's program, which was based in large part on the screenplay by Graham Gordy, whose other film credits include The Love Guru and My Dog Skip.

== Release and reception ==
War Eagle, Arkansas was released in the U.S. by Empire Film Group on June 12, 2009.

Philip Martin of the Arkansas Democrat-Gazette, wrote "My opinion of the movie hasn't changed over the months - it's an example of tough-minded, well-executed independent filmmaking rooted in the specific circumstances of credible human characters that requires no special dispensation for being locally produced. It's a damn good movie, and everyone associated with it has a right to be proud".
