= American Sniper =

2014 film by Clint Eastwood

- Theatrical release poster
- Directed by: Clint Eastwood
- Written by: Jason Hall
- Based on: American Sniper by Chris Kyle; Scott McEwen; Jim DeFelice
- Produced by: Clint Eastwood; Robert Lorenz; Andrew Lazar; Bradley Cooper; Peter Morgan
- Starring: Bradley Cooper; Sienna Miller
- Cinematography: Tom Stern
- Edited by: Joel Cox; Gary D. Roach
- Production companies: Village Roadshow Pictures; RatPac-Dune Entertainment; Mad Chance Productions; 22nd & Indiana Pictures; Malpaso Productions
- Distributed by: Warner Bros. Pictures
- Release dates: November 11, 2014 (AFI Fest); December 25, 2014 (United States)
- Running time: 132 minutes
- Country: United States
- Language: English
- Budget: $59 million
- Box office: $547.7 million

American Sniper is a 2014 American biographical film directed and co-produced by Clint Eastwood and written and executive-produced by Jason Hall, based on the memoir of the same name by Chris Kyle with Scott McEwen and Jim DeFelice. The film follows the life of Kyle, who became the deadliest marksman in U.S. military history with 255 kills from four tours in the Iraq War, 160 of which were officially confirmed by the Department of Defense. While Kyle was celebrated for his military successes, his tours of duty took a heavy toll on his personal and family life. It stars Bradley Cooper as Kyle and Sienna Miller as his wife Taya, with Luke Grimes, Jake McDorman, Cory Hardrict, Kevin Lacz, Navid Negahban, and Keir O'Donnell in supporting roles.

American Sniper premiered at the American Film Institute Festival on November 11, 2014, and had a limited theatrical release in the United States on December 25, 2014 by Warner Bros. Pictures, followed by a wide release on January 16, 2015. It received generally positive reviews, with praise for Cooper's lead performance and Eastwood's direction, although it also attracted some controversy over its portrayal of both the Iraq War and Kyle himself. The film grossed over $547 million worldwide, making it the 13th-highest-grossing film of 2014, and Eastwood's highest-grossing film.

At the 87th Academy Awards, American Sniper received six nominations, including Best Picture, Best Adapted Screenplay, and Best Actor for Cooper, ultimately winning one for Best Sound Editing.

== Plot ==
Growing up in Texas, Chris Kyle is taught by his father how to shoot a rifle and hunt deer. Years later, Chris has become a ranch hand and rodeo cowboy, and returns home early to find his girlfriend in bed with another man. After telling her to leave, he sees news coverage of the 1998 U.S. embassy bombings and decides to enlist in the Navy. He qualifies for special training and becomes a sniper with the U.S. Navy SEALs.

Chris meets Taya Studebaker at an Irish pub in San Diego, and the two soon marry. He is sent to the Iraq War after the September 11 attacks. His first kills are a woman and a boy who attacked U.S. Marines on patrol with a Russian-made RKG-3 anti-tank grenade. Chris is visibly upset by the experience, but later earns the nickname "Legend" for his many kills.

Assigned to hunt for the al-Qaeda leader, Abu Musab al-Zarqawi, Chris interrogates a family whose father offers to lead the SEALs to "The Butcher", al-Zarqawi's second-in-command. The plan goes awry when The Butcher captures the father and his son, killing them while a sniper pins down Chris. This sniper goes by the name Mustafa and is an Olympic Games medalist from Syria. Meanwhile, the insurgents issue a bounty on Chris.

Chris returns home to his wife and the birth of his son. He is distracted by memories of his war experiences and by Taya's concern for them as a couple. She wishes he would focus on his home and family.

Chris leaves for a second tour and is promoted to chief petty officer. Involved in a shootout with The Butcher, he helps kill him. Chris becomes increasingly distant from his family when he returns home to a newborn daughter. On Chris's third tour, Mustafa seriously injures a unit member, Ryan "Biggles" Job, and the unit is evacuated back to base. When they decide to return to the field and continue the mission, another SEAL, Marc Lee, is killed by gunfire.

Guilt compels Chris to undertake a fourth tour, and Taya tells him she may not be there when he returns. Back in Iraq, Chris is shocked to learn Biggles died in surgery to repair the wounds he sustained. Assigned to kill Mustafa, who has been sniping U.S. Army combat engineers building a barricade, Chris's sniper team is placed on a rooftop inside enemy territory.

Chris spots Mustafa and takes him out with a risky long-distance shot at 2,100 yards (1,920 m), but this exposes his team's position to numerous armed insurgents. Amid the gunfight and low on ammunition, Chris tearfully calls Taya and tells her he is ready to come home. A sandstorm provides concealment for a chaotic escape in which he is injured and almost left behind.

After Chris gets back stateside, on edge and unable to adjust fully to civilian life, a Veterans Affairs psychiatrist asks if he is haunted by all the things he did in war. When he replies that "all the guys [he] couldn't save" haunt him, the psychiatrist encourages him to help severely wounded veterans in the VA hospital. After that, Chris gradually begins to adjust to home life.

Years later, on February 2, 2013, Chris says goodbye to his wife and family as he leaves in good spirits to spend time with Eddie Ray Routh, a veteran suffering from PTSD, at a shooting range. An on-screen subtitle reveals that Chris was killed that day by Routh, followed by archive footage of crowds standing along the highway for his funeral procession. More are shown attending his memorial service.

== Cast ==
- Bradley Cooper as Chris Kyle
- Sienna Miller as Taya
- Luke Grimes as Marc Lee
- Jake McDorman as Ryan Job
- Cory Hardrict as "D" / Dandridge
- Kevin Lacz as himself
- Navid Negahban as Sheikh Al-Obodi
- Keir O'Donnell as Jeff Kyle
- Eric Close as DIA Agent Snead
- Fahim Fazli as Messianic tribal leader

In addition, Sammy Sheik appears as Mustafa, a character partially based on Iraqi sniper Juba, while Mido Hamada portrays The Butcher, a character possibly based on Abu Deraa. Clint Eastwood himself had an uncredited cameo as the man walking into the church at the beginning of the film.

== Production ==
=== Development ===
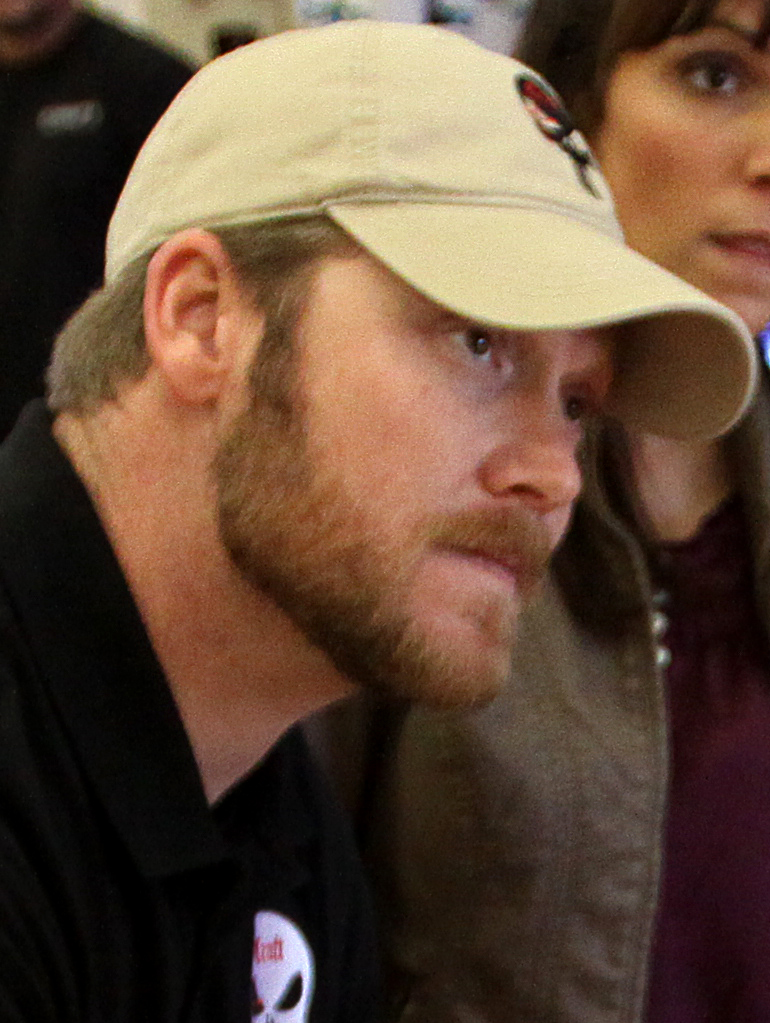
Chris Kyle in 2012

On May 24, 2012, it was announced that Warner Bros. had acquired the rights to the book with Bradley Cooper set to produce and star in the screen adaptation. Cooper had thought of Chris Pratt to play Chris Kyle, but Warner Bros. agreed to buy it only if Cooper would star. In September 2012, David O. Russell said he was interested in directing the film. On February 2, 2013, Chris Kyle was murdered. On May 2, 2013, it was announced that Steven Spielberg would direct. Spielberg had read Kyle's book, though he desired to have a more psychological conflict present in the screenplay so an "enemy sniper" character could serve as the insurgent sharpshooter who was trying to track down and kill Kyle. Spielberg's ideas contributed to the development of a lengthy screenplay approaching 160 pages. Due to Warner Bros.' budget constraints, Spielberg felt he could not bring his vision of the story to the screen. On August 5, 2013, Spielberg dropped out of directing. On August 21, 2013, it was reported that Clint Eastwood would instead direct the film.

=== Casting ===
On March 14, 2014, Sienna Miller joined the cast. On March 16, 2014, Kyle Gallner was cast, as was Cory Hardrict on March 18, 2014. On March 20, 2014, Navid Negahban, Eric Close, Eric Ladin, Rey Gallegos, and Jake McDorman also joined the cast, as did Luke Grimes and Sam Jaeger on March 25, 2014. Kevin Lacz, a former Navy SEAL, was also cast and served as a technical advisor. Another former Navy SEAL, Joel Lambert, also joined the film, portraying a Delta sniper. On June 3, Max Charles was added to the cast to portray Kyle's son, Colton Kyle.

=== Filming ===
Principal photography began on March 31, 2014, in Los Angeles, with additional filming in Morocco. On April 23, the Los Angeles Times reported that ten days of filming set in an Afghan village was set to begin at the Blue Cloud Movie Ranch in the Santa Clarita area. On May 7, shooting of the film was spotted around El Centro; a milk factory was used as the abandoned date factory which insurgents close in on from all directions at the climax of the film. The pier and bar scenes were filmed in Seal Beach, California.

Cinematographer Tom Stern shot the film with Arri Alexa XT digital cameras and Panavision C-, E- and G-Series anamorphic lenses. The film is Eastwood's second to be shot digitally, after Jersey Boys.

=== Music ===
There is no "Music by" credit on this film. Clint Eastwood, who has composed the scores for most of his films since Mystic River (2003), is credited as the composer of "Taya's Theme". Joseph S. DeBeasi is credited as composer of additional music and as music editor. The film also features the song "Someone Like You" by Van Morrison, which plays during the wedding scene, and "The Funeral" by Ennio Morricone.

== Reception ==
=== Box office ===
American Sniper grossed $350.2 million in North America and $197.5 million in other territories for a worldwide total of $547.7 million, against a budget of around $59 million. Calculating in all expenses and revenues, Deadline Hollywood estimated that the film made a profit of $243 million, making it the second-most profitable film of 2014 only behind Paramount's Transformers: Age of Extinction. Worldwide, it is the highest-grossing war film of all time (breaking Saving Private Ryan's record) and Eastwood's highest-grossing film to date. It is the seventh R-rated film to gross over $500 million.

==== North America ====
In North America, it was the highest-grossing film of 2014, the highest-grossing war film unadjusted for inflation (and, on an adjusted basis, second to Saving Private Ryan with $379 million), the fourth-highest-grossing R-rated film of all time (behind The Passion of the Christ, Deadpool, and Deadpool & Wolverine), Warner Bros.' fourth-highest-grossing film (behind The Dark Knight, The Dark Knight Rises and Harry Potter and the Deathly Hallows – Part 2), and the eighth-highest-grossing Best Picture nominee film (behind Avatar, Titanic, Star Wars, E.T. the Extra-Terrestrial, Toy Story 3, The Lord of the Rings: The Return of the King and The Lord of the Rings: The Two Towers). It became the seventh Warner Bros.' film to earn over $300 million in the U.S. and Canada and the 50th film to reach the mark. It earned as much as the combined earnings of all of the other 2014 Best Picture nominees. On March 8, 2015, it surpassed The Hunger Games: Mockingjay – Part 1 to become the highest-grossing film of 2014, making it the first R-rated film since Saving Private Ryan (1998) and the first non-franchise film since Avatar (2009) to top the year-end rankings.

American Sniper premiered at the AFI Fest on November 11, 2014, just after a screening of Selma at Grauman's Egyptian Theatre in Los Angeles. In North America, the film opened to a limited release on December 25, 2014, playing at four theaters—two in New York, one in Los Angeles, and one in Dallas—and earned $610,000 in its opening weekend ($850,000 including Christmas Day) at an average of $152,500 per venue debuting at #22. The following week the film earned $676,909 playing at the same number of locations at an average of $169,277 per theater, which is the second-biggest weekend average ever for a live-action movie (previously held by 2001's Moulin Rouge!). American Sniper holds the record for the most entries in the top 20 Top Weekend Theater Averages with 3 entries (at #12, #14 and #17). It earned a total of $3.4 million from limited release in three weekends.

The film began its wide debut across North American theaters on January 16, 2015 (Thursday night showings began at 7:00 pm). It set an all-time-highest Thursday night opening record for an R-rated drama with $5.3 million (previously held by Lone Survivor). The film topped the box office on its opening day grossing $30.5 million (including Thursday previews) from 3,555 theaters setting January records for both biggest debut opening (previously held by Cloverfield) and single-day gross (previously held by Avatar). In its traditional three-day opening the film earned $89.2 million which was double than expected and broke the record for the largest January opening (previously held by Ride Along) and the largest winter opening, which is also Eastwood's top opening as a director (breaking Gran Torino's opening). The three-day opening is also the biggest opening weekend for a drama film (previously held by The Passion of the Christ), the second-biggest debut for a Best Picture Oscar nominee (behind Toy Story 3), the second-biggest debut for an R-rated film (behind The Matrix Reloaded), and the third-biggest for a non-comic book, non-fantasy/sci-fi film (behind Furious 7 and Fast & Furious 6). It also set an IMAX January opening and single weekend record with $10.6 million (previously held by Avatar in its fourth weekend) and an R-rated IMAX debut record (previously held by Prometheus). It earned $107.2 million during its four-day Martin Luther King weekend setting a record for the biggest R-rated four-day gross.

In its second weekend, the film expanded to 3,705 theaters making it the second-widest launch for an R-rated movie (behind the film itself). It grossed an estimated $64.6 million in its second weekend, declining only by 28%—and set the record for the second-best hold ever for a movie opening to more than $85 million and also set the record for the eighth-largest second-weekend gross. In just 10 days of release, the film surpassed Pearl Harbor ($198.5 million) to become the second-highest-grossing war film in North America. By its second weekend, Box Office Mojo had already reported that the film was on poise to become the highest-grossing film of 2014 in North America, a record that was, at the time held by The Hunger Games: Mockingjay – Part 1 ($334 million), judging from its gradual decline and strong holdovers. It became the highest-grossing IMAX film of January grossing $18.8 million from 333 IMAX theaters. On Thursday, January 29, 2015–35 days after its initial release, the film surpassed Saving Private Ryan ($216.5 million) to become the highest-grossing war film in North America, unadjusted for inflation.

By its third weekend of wide release, the film expanded to 3,885 theaters (180 additional theaters added), breaking its own record of being the widest R-rated film ever released. The film topped the box office through its third weekend earning $30.66 million, which is the second-highest Super Bowl weekend gross (behind Hannah Montana and Miley Cyrus: Best of Both Worlds Concert). After topping the box office for three consecutive weekends, the film was overtaken by The SpongeBob Movie: Sponge Out of Water in its fourth weekend.

==== Outside North America ====
The film had the biggest debut weekend for a Clint Eastwood film, and went on to become the director's top-grossing film of all time in each of the countries in which it was released. In Italy the film opened at number two with $7.1 million, Eastwood's best opening of all time, and Warner Bros.' second-biggest opening for a non-franchise U.S. film there; it went on to top the box office the following weekend as well. Its other largest openings occurred in France ($6.3 million), where it topped the box office for four consecutive weekends, Australia ($4.3 million, $4.6 million including previews), the UK, Ireland and Malta ($3.8 million), Spain ($3.2 million), Japan ($2.8 million), Mexico ($2.6 million), Brazil ($1.8 million), and South Korea ($1.2 million). In total earnings, its largest market outside of the U.S. are Italy ($23 million) and France ($22.8 million).

=== Critical response ===
On Rotten Tomatoes, American Sniper holds an approval rating of 72%, based on 299 reviews, with an average rating of 6.90/10. The website's critical consensus states, "Powered by Clint Eastwood's sure-handed direction and a gripping central performance from Bradley Cooper, American Sniper delivers a tense, vivid tribute to its real-life subject." On Metacritic, the film has a weighted average score of 73 out of 100, based on 48 critics, indicating "generally favorable reviews". In CinemaScore polls conducted during the opening weekend, audiences gave American Sniper a rare grade of "A+" on an A+ to F scale.

Todd McCarthy of The Hollywood Reporter called the film "A taut, vivid and sad account of the brief life of the most accomplished marksman in American military annals." Justin Chang of Variety gave the film a positive review, saying: "an excellent performance from a bulked-up Bradley Cooper, this harrowing and intimate character study offers fairly blunt insights into the physical and psychological toll exacted on the front lines". David Denby of The New Yorker gave the film a positive review, saying "Both a devastating war movie and a devastating antiwar movie, a subdued celebration of a warrior's skill and a sorrowful lament over his alienation and misery." Keith Phipps of The Dissolve wrote that the film, while well made, missed a chance to explore the toll that such service exacts on soldiers. Chris Nashawaty of Entertainment Weekly gave the film a C+, saying "The film's just a repetition of context-free combat missions and one-dimensional targets." Elizabeth Weitzman of New York Daily News gave the film four out of five stars, saying "The best movies are ever-shifting, intelligent and open-hearted enough to expand alongside an audience. American Sniper ... is built on this foundation of uncommon compassion."

Peter Travers of Rolling Stone gave the film three-and-a-half stars out of four, saying "Bradley Cooper, as Navy SEAL Chris Kyle, and director Eastwood salute Kyle's patriotism best by not denying its toll. Their targets are clearly in sight, and their aim is true." Ignatiy Vishnevetsky of The A.V. Club gave the film a B, saying "American Sniper is imperfect and at times a little corny, but also ambivalent and complicated in ways that are uniquely Eastwoodian." James Berardinelli of ReelViews gave the film three-and-a-half stars out of four, saying "American Sniper lifts director Clint Eastwood out of the doldrums that have plagued his last few films." Rafer Guzman of Newsday gave the film three out of four stars, saying "Cooper nails the role of an American killing machine in Clint Eastwood's clear-eyed look at the Iraq War." Kenneth Turan of the Los Angeles Times gave the film a positive review, saying "Eastwood's impeccably crafted action sequences so catch us up in the chaos of combat we are almost not aware that we're watching a film at all." Claudia Puig of USA Today gave the film three out of four stars, saying "It's clearly Cooper's show. Substantially bulked up and affecting a believable Texas drawl, Cooper embodies Kyle's confidence, intensity and vulnerability." Joshua Rothkopf of Time Out New York gave the film four out of five stars, saying "Only Clint Eastwood could make a movie about an Iraq War veteran and infuse it with doubts, mission anxiety and ruination." Dean Obeidallah praised the film, saying "His focus was not on whom we were fighting, but the unbearably high price Americans pay for waging war regardless of its target. The film is a cautionary tale for Americans about why we must avoid war. It is not a celebration of waging it."

The film drew some negative reviews. Matt Taibbi, in Rolling Stone, wrote that the movie turned the complicated moral questions and mass-bloodshed of the Iraq war into a black and white fairy tale, without presenting the historical context. Alex von Tunzelmann of The Guardian argued that the film presented a simplified black and white portrayal of the Iraq war, and that it features the distortion of facts into unreliable myths based upon previous legends. David Masciotra of Salon criticized the movie's focus on physical rather than moral courage as the ultimate manly virtue. Cavalry scout sniper Garett Reppenhagen stated that he did not view Iraqi civilians as savages, but as part of a friendly culture for which the movie has furthered ignorance, fear, and bigotry. Inkoo Kang of TheWrap gave the film a negative review, saying "Director Clint Eastwood's focus on Kyle is so tight that no other character, including wife Taya (Sienna Miller), comes through as a person, and the scope so narrow that the film engages only superficially with the many moral issues surrounding the Iraq War." Several other articles have also been critical of the movie.

Responding to critics, Eastwood said that American Sniper shows "what [war] does to the people left behind", and that presenting "the fact of what [war] does to the family and the people who have to go back into civilian life like Chris Kyle did" is the "biggest antiwar statement any film" can make. He stated: "One of my favorite war movies that I've been involved with is Letters from Iwo Jima and that was about family, about being taken away from life, being sent someplace. In World War II, everybody just sort of went home and got over it. Now there is some effort to help people through it." He also said: "I was a child growing up during World War II. That was supposed to be the one to end all wars. And four years later, I was standing at the draft board being drafted during the Korean conflict, and then after that there was Vietnam, and it goes on and on forever ... I just wonder ... does this ever stop? And no, it doesn't. So each time we get in these conflicts, it deserves a lot of thought before we go wading in or wading out. Going in or coming out. It needs a better thought process, I think."

Bradley Cooper stated that much of the criticism ignores that the film was about widespread neglect of returning veterans, and that people who take issue with Kyle should redirect their attention to the leaders who put the troops there in the first place. He said: "We looked at hopefully igniting attention about the lack of care that goes to vets. [Any] discussion that has nothing to do with vets, or what we did or did not do [for them], every conversation in those terms is moving farther and farther from what our soldiers go through, and the fact that 22 veterans commit suicide each day." Cooper said that an increasing number of soldiers are returning from conflict psychologically damaged, only to be more or less discarded.

Former First Lady Michelle Obama and former Republican Party vice presidential nominee Sarah Palin also spoke out in support of the movie.

=== Historical accuracy ===
Several major news sources commented on the accuracy of the film and how it differs from Chris Kyle's written accounts. The enemy sniper Mustafa is a major character in the film but receives only a small mention in the memoir; Kyle noted: "I never saw him, but other snipers later killed an Iraqi sniper we think was him." According to the memoir, Kyle's 2100-yard shot was taken against an insurgent holding a rocket launcher, not Mustafa. Time notes that according to screenwriter Jason Hall, Kyle said of Mustafa: "He shot my friend. I'm not going to put his name in my book." The first combat scene in the film has Kyle killing a boy and mother who try to attack U.S. troops with a grenade; the boy was added for the film. The film's narrative has Navy SEAL Ryan "Biggles" Job dying from surgical complications from an operation on his face relatively soon after being shot in Iraq, but in reality it was several years later. The character "the Butcher" was created for the film, although this character may have been based on the real-life Abu Deraa or Ahmad Hashim Abd al-Isawi. The visual blog Information is Beautiful stated that, while taking creative licence into account, the film was 56.9% accurate when compared to real-life events, summarizing: "a lot of the events in the movie did happen, although Kyle's involvement in them was repeatedly exaggerated".

In the film, Kyle decides to join the navy after watching the 1998 United States embassy bombings on TV. In reality, this did not contribute to his decision.

=== Prop baby ===
One aspect of the film that received negative comment was its use of a fake baby doll in one scene, which was said to look obviously artificial and distracting to critics and audiences. In at least one media screening of the film, the audience laughed out loud at how artificial the doll appeared. When discussing the film's prospects for winning an Academy Award, Fandango critic Dave Karger said, "The reason why American Sniper is not going to win is because of the plastic baby." In The Telegraph, journalist Mark Harris said, "That plastic baby is going to be rationalised by Eastwood auteur cultists until the end of days." In response, screenwriter Jason Hall replied, "Hate to ruin the fun but real baby #1 showed up with a fever. Real baby #2 was no show. [Clint voice] 'Gimme the doll, kid.'"

=== Top ten lists ===
American Sniper was listed on many critics' top ten lists.

- 1st – Kyle Smith, New York Post
- 3rd – Ty Burr, Boston Globe
- 6th – Richard Brody, The New Yorker
- 6th – James Verniere, Boston Herald
- 7th – James Berardinelli, Reelviews
- 8th – Mara Reinstein, Us Weekly
- 9th – Scott Feinberg, The Hollywood Reporter
- 9th – Elizabeth Weitzman, New York Daily News
- 10th – Scott Foundas, Variety
- 10th – People
- Top 10 (ranked alphabetically) – David Denby, The New Yorker
- Best of 2014 (listed alphabetically, not ranked) – Kenneth Turan, Los Angeles Times
- Best of 2014 (listed alphabetically, not ranked) – Manohla Dargis, The New York Times

=== Home media ===
American Sniper was released on Blu-ray and DVD on May 19, 2015 by Warner Home Video.

Upon its first week of release on home media in the United States, the film topped both the Nielsen VideoScan First Alert chart, which tracks overall disc sales, as well as the Blu-ray Disc sales chart in the week ending May 24, 2015.

== Accolades ==
Organizations	Category	Recipient(s)	Result	Ref(s)
Academy Awards	Best Picture	Clint Eastwood, Robert Lorenz, Andrew Lazar, Bradley Cooper and Peter Morgan	Nominated	
Academy Awards	Best Actor	Bradley Cooper	Nominated	
Academy Awards	Best Adapted Screenplay	Jason Hall	Nominated	
Academy Awards	Best Film Editing	Joel Cox and Gary D. Roach	Nominated	
Academy Awards	Best Sound Editing	Alan Robert Murray and Bub Asman	Won	
Academy Awards	Best Sound Mixing	John T. Reitz, Gregg Rudloff and Walt Martin	Nominated	
Art Directors Guild Awards	Excellence in Production Design for a Contemporary Film	James J. Murakami, Charisse Cardenas	Nominated	
ACE Eddie Awards	Best Edited Feature Film – Dramatic	Joel Cox and Gary D. Roach	Nominated	
American Film Institute Awards 2014	Top Ten Films of the Year		Won	
British Academy Film Awards	Best Adapted Screenplay	Jason Hall	Nominated	
British Academy Film Awards	Best Sound	Walt Martin, John Reitz, Gregg Rudloff, Alan Robert Murray, Bub Asman	Nominated	
Cinema Audio Society Awards	Outstanding Achievement in Sound Mixing for a Motion Picture – Live Action	Walt Martin, Gregg Rudloff, John Reitz, Robert Fernandez, Thomas J. O'Connell, James Ashwell	Nominated	
Critics' Choice Award	Best Action Movie	American Sniper	Nominated	
Critics' Choice Award	Best Actor in an Action Movie	Bradley Cooper	Won	
Denver Film Critics Society	Best Picture	American Sniper	Won	
Denver Film Critics Society	Best Director	Clint Eastwood	Nominated	
Denver Film Critics Society	Best Actor	Bradley Cooper (tied with Ralph Fiennes in The Grand Budapest Hotel)	Won	
Denver Film Critics Society	Best Supporting Actress	Sienna Miller	Nominated	
Denver Film Critics Society	Best Adapted Screenplay	Jason Hall	Nominated	
Denver Film Critics Society	Best Cinematography	Tom Stern	Nominated	
Directors Guild of America Award	Outstanding Directing – Feature Film	Clint Eastwood	Nominated	
Empire Awards	Best Actor	Bradley Cooper	Nominated	
Iowa Film Critics	Best Movie Yet to Open in Iowa	American Sniper (tied with A Most Violent Year)	Won	
MPSE Golden Reel Awards	Feature English Language - Effects/Foley	Bub Asman, Alan Robert Murray	Won	
MTV Movie Awards	Movie of the Year	American Sniper	Nominated	
MTV Movie Awards	Best Male Performance	Bradley Cooper	Won	
National Board of Review	Top Ten Film		Won	
National Board of Review	Best Director	Clint Eastwood	Won	
Producers Guild of America Awards	Best Theatrical Motion Picture	Bradley Cooper, Clint Eastwood, Andrew Lazar, Robert Lorenz, Peter Morgan	Nominated	
Satellite Awards	Best Adapted Screenplay	Jason Hall	Nominated	
Satellite Awards	Best Editing	Gary Roach and Joel Cox	Nominated	
Saturn Awards	Best Thriller Film	American Sniper	Nominated	
Writers Guild of America Awards	Best Adapted Screenplay	Jason Hall	Nominated	

== See also ==
- List of films featuring the United States Navy SEALs
- Battle for Sevastopol
- Enemy at the Gates
- Films based on the September 11 attacks
