= Performance medicine =

Performance Medicine is a sub-specialty of clinical and diagnostic medicine that is focused on the optimization of emotional, mental, and emotional well-being and performance. It is a new medical specialty that merges the goals of internal medicine, anti-ageing medicine, functional medicine, sports medicine and preventative health care.

Performance medicine differs fundamentally from other areas of medicine by focusing on the healthy non-injured individual that is at low risk of sub-clinical or clinical disease. This population of individuals responds poorly to the current medical paradigm. It uses the principles of evidence-based medicine not to treat disease, but optimize function to reach higher levels of well-being and performance. This is the medical analog to the field of positive psychology, which uses the scientific principles of psychology not to treat mental disease, but to increase life satisfaction.

The aims of Performance medicine are to increase the body's ability to resist, postpone or prevent disease and/or injury. and maximise human performance in terms of adaptive capacity, endurance, and physical fitness. Performance medicine physicians aim to measure the capacity and interaction of the body's functional systems over time and to modify exposure to environmental factors in such a way that an individual's health is optimised by operating at the "sweet spot" where both performance and longevity are maximimised. This is achieved through an increased adaptive capacity, which is the body's ability to turn stressors into growth opportunities.

The goals of performance medicine have been summarised and include the following:

1. a focus on maintaining and increasing an individual's adaptive capacity throughout adult life
2. the maximisation of an individual's metabolic efficiency
3. the adoption of strategies that increase an individual's resistance to disease and postpone or prevent disease where possible

== Improving Well-Being ==
An organism's adaptive capacity determines its ability to adapt to new stressors. Performance Medicine aims to increase an individual's adaptive capacity via functional improvements of the immune system, nervous system, hormonal system, and digestive system. This increase in adaptive capacity increases the ability of the individual to deal with stressors and thereby increases life satisfaction, as well as emotional, mental and physical functioning. An organism's adaptive capacity can be self-regulated. Interoception is described as the collection of processes by which physiological signals in the body are transmitted back to the brain, allowing the organism to regulate the internal state homeostatically and which may also give rise to awareness of bodily feelings (e.g. pain, touch, temperature). The neural pathways that carry sensory information from the body to the brain facilitates the homeostatic regulation of purely physiological reflexes like breathing and blood pressure. However these afferent pathways may also transfer sources of information about the state and function of the body that could influence higher mental functions (cognition) and behaviour. By increasing interoceptive awareness one may develop methods of improving and regulating their own physiological performance and states of wellbeing.

== Improving Adaptation in Athletes ==
The basis of Performance Medicine in improving athletic performance lies in the understanding that the functions of the immune system, nervous system, hormonal system, and digestive system govern adaptation to training. All environmental stimuli (including training and nutrition) are processed by these systems, which will respond with adaptation, if their capacity permits. It is therefore the functions of these systems, which determine the result of all training stimuli.

Performance Medicine is to be clearly distinguished from sports science and sports coaching, which is mostly concerned with the optimal composition of training stimuli. In Performance Medicine the main concern is the functional status of the athlete's adaptive systems.

== See also ==
- What is Performance Medicine
