= Dick Couch =

American novelist and US Navy SEAL

- Born: Mississippi, U.S.
- Education: United States Naval Academy
- Occupations: Author, professor

Dick Couch is an American author, professor, and former U.S. Navy SEAL.

== Early life and education ==
Couch was born in Mississippi and raised in Southern Indiana. He graduated from the United States Naval Academy in 1967. After attending Drone Anti-Submarine Helicopter (DASH) controller training, he reported aboard the naval destroyer USS Mansfield. He graduated from Basic Underwater Demolition/SEAL (BUD/S) Class 45 in 1969, and was the class Honorman. He graduated first in his class at the Navy Underwater Swimmers School and the Army Free Fall (HALO) School. As Whiskey Platoon Commander with SEAL Team One in Vietnam, he led one of the few successful prisoner of war rescue operations of that conflict.

== Career ==
Following his release from active duty service in the U.S. Navy, Couch served as a maritime and paramilitary case officer with the Central Intelligence Agency. In 1997, he retired from the Naval Reserve with the rank of Captain. At that time, he held the senior command billet in the SEAL reserve community.

== Personal life ==
Couch and his wife, Julia, live in Idaho. However, he is currently serving as a professor of Ethics at the United States Naval Academy.

== Bibliography ==
=== Fiction ===
- Seal Team One (1991 ISBN 978-1591141341)
- Pressure Point (1993; 2006 ISBN 0743464265)
- Silent Descent (1994 ISBN 978-0399138973)
- Rising Wind (1996 ISBN 978-1557501332)
- The Mercenary Option (2003 ISBN 0743480112)
- Covert Action (2005 ISBN 0743464257)
- Tom Clancy Presents: Act of Valor (Novelization of film of the same name, 2012 ISBN 978-0425259351)
- Tom Clancy's Op-Center: Out of the Ashes (with George Galdorisi, 2014 ISBN 978-1250026835)
- Tom Clancy's Op-Center: Into the Fire (with George Galdorisi, 2015 ISBN 9781250026842)

=== Non-fiction ===
- The Warrior Elite: The Forging of SEAL Class 228 (2003 ISBN 978-1400046959)
- U.S. Armed Forces Nuclear, Biological And Chemical Survival Manual 2003 ISBN 978-0465007974
- The Finishing School: Earning the Navy SEAL Trident (2005 ISBN 978-0609810460)
- Down Range: Navy SEALs in the War on Terrorism (2006 ISBN 978-1400081011)
- Chosen Soldier: The Making of A Special Forces Warrior (2007 ISBN 978-0307339393)
- The Sheriff of Ramadi: Navy SEALs and the Winning of al-Anbar (2008 ISBN 978-1591141471)
- A Tactical Ethic: Moral Conduct in the Insurgent Battlespace (2010 ISBN 978-1591141372)
- Sua Sponte: The Forging of a Modern American Ranger (2012 ISBN 978-0425253601)
- Always Faithful, Always Forward: The Forging of a Special Operations Marine (2014 ISBN 978-0425268599)
- By Honor Bound: Two Navy SEALs, the Medal of Honor, and a Story of Extraordinary Courage Tom Norris and Mike Thornton, with Dick Couch (2016 ISBN 978-1250070593)
