= Seth Stone =

United States Navy SEAL (born 1976)

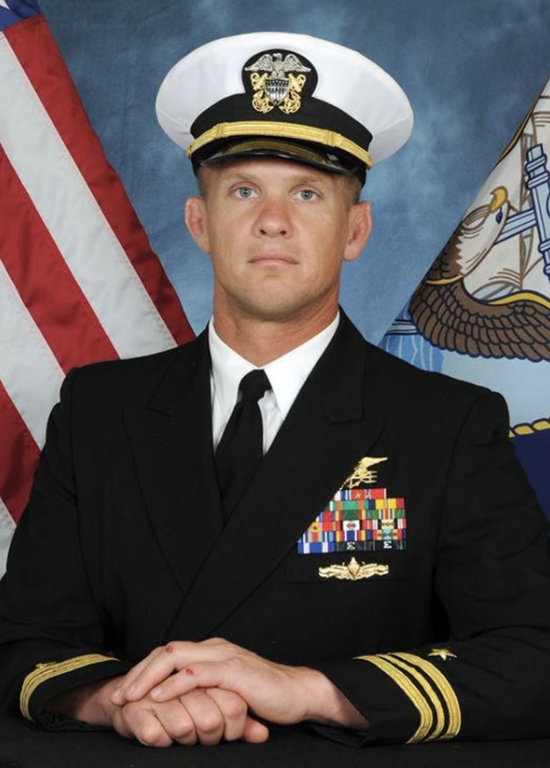
- Nickname: Stoner
- Born: September 17, 1976; Houston, TX, U.S.
- Died: September 30, 2017 (aged 41) Perris, California, U.S.
- Cause of death: Parachuting Accident
- Allegiance: United States
- Branch: United States Navy
- Rank: Commander
- Conflicts: Iraq War: Battle of Ramadi
- Awards: Silver Star (x2) with Gold Star awards; Bronze Star with Valor device; Army Commendation Medal with Valor device; Navy Commendation Medal; Navy Achievement Medal; Meritorious Unit Commendation

Seth Stone (September 17, 1976 - September 30, 2017) was a former United States Navy SEAL and two time Silver Star recipient.

== Early life and education ==
Stone was born September 17, 1976, in Houston, Texas. His passion for serving his country led him to pursue a career in the military.

== Military career ==
CDR. Stone attended the US Naval Academy and graduated 1999 with the service selection as a SWO (Surface Warfare Officer). After about two years, he was able to go to transfer and successfully completed Basic Underwater Demolition/SEAL (BUD/S) training. He demonstrated exceptional skills in various tactical operations, including marksmanship, hand-to-hand combat, and mission planning. His past assignments include Naval Special Warfare Command and the USS Gettysburg (CG-64). Stone's military training included Navy Freefall Parachutist, Basic Underwater Demolitions/SEAL, Survival Evasion Resistance Escape (SERE), Airborne, Special Operations Survival Training, Tomahawk Watch Officer, Basic Aegis Officer Console Operator, Surface Warfare Gunnery and Harpoon Officer.

Throughout his career, Stone was deployed to numerous conflict zones. His service included multiple deployments to Iraq and Afghanistan, including the Battle of Ramadi in 2006.

== Personal life ==
Stone died September 30, 2017, after his parachute failed to deploy thousands of feet in the air. Stone was 41. At the time of the incident, Commander Stone, who was assigned to Special Operations Command Pacific, was on leave. The coroner's investigation, detailed in the autopsy report, indicates that Stone had jumped from a hot-air balloon at approximately 4,000 feet altitude.

== Awards and decorations ==
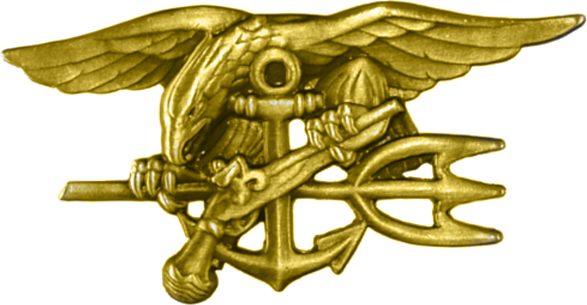

Badge	Special Warfare insignia		
1st Row	Silver Star with 1 Gold 5/16 inch star		Bronze Star with "V" device and 1 Gold 5/16 inch star
2nd Row	Army Commendation Ribbon	Navy and Marine Corps Achievement Medal	Combat Action Ribbon
3rd Row	Valorous Unit Award	Navy Unit Commendation	Navy Meritorious Unit Commendation
4th Row	National Defense Service Medal with 1 Bronze 3/16 inch service star	Afghanistan Campaign Medal with 2 bronze 3/16 inch stars	Iraq Campaign Medal with 3 bronze 3/16 inch stars
5th Row	Global War on Terrorism Expeditionary Medal	Global War on Terrorism Service Medal	Navy Sea Service Deployment Ribbon with 4 bronze 3/16 inch stars
6th Row	NATO Medal	Navy Rifle Marksmanship Medal with expert device	Navy Pistol Marksmanship Medal with expert device
Badge	Surface Warfare Officer Insignia		
Badge	Navy and Marine Corps Parachutist Insignia		
