= Marc Alan Lee =

United States Navy sailor (1978–2006)

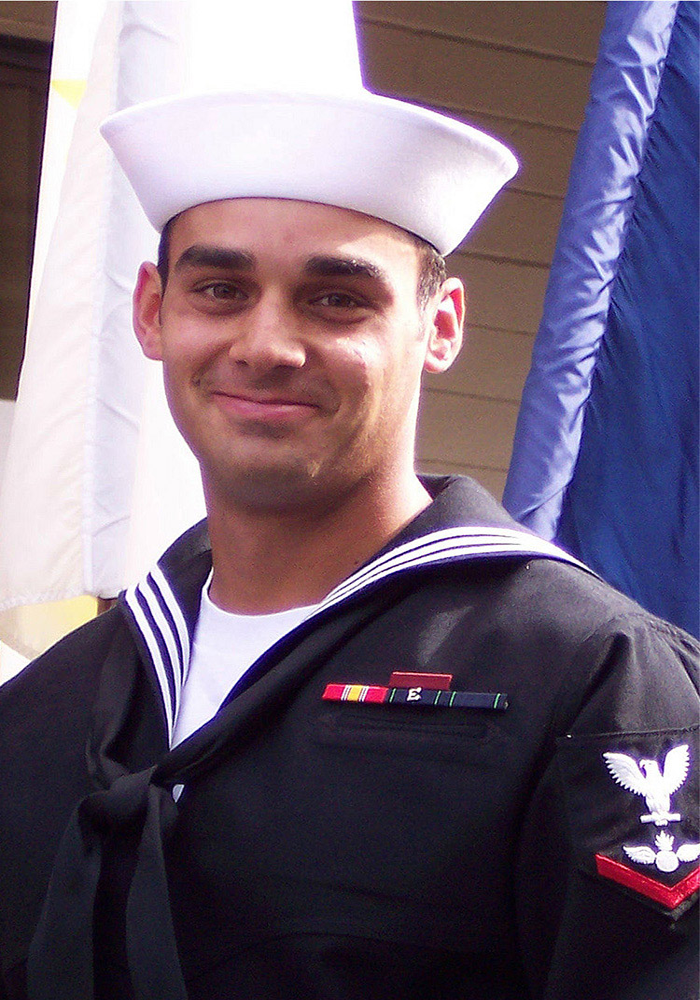
- Lee in his dress blues
- Born: March 20, 1978; Portland, Oregon, United States
- Died: August 2, 2006 (aged 28); Ramadi, Iraq
- Military career
- Allegiance: United States
- Branch: United States Navy
- Service years: 2001–2006
- Rank: Petty officer second class (Occupation: Aviation Ordnanceman)
- Unit: SEAL Team 3
- Conflicts: Iraq War; Battle of Ramadi
- Awards: Silver Star; Bronze Star Medal; Purple Heart; Navy Unit Commendation

Marc Alan Lee (March 20, 1978 – August 2, 2006) was a United States Navy SEAL. He was the first SEAL to lose his life in Operation Iraqi Freedom when he was killed in a fierce firefight while on patrol against insurgents in Ramadi. Lee was posthumously awarded the Silver Star, the Bronze Star Medal with Valor and the Purple Heart. On March 20, 2013, the Marc A. Lee Training Center building was dedicated at the Naval Amphibious Base Coronado.

== Early life ==
Lee was born in Portland, Oregon, and moved to Colorado when he was one year old with his mother Debbie and brother and sister. When he was seven, he and his family moved back to Hood River, Oregon. Lee was home-schooled until his Junior year and graduated from Baptist Christian School, now Horizon Christian School, in 1996. In 1997, he moved to Colorado once again to pursue his dream of a career in professional soccer. He was scheduled for tryouts with the Colorado Rapids. In an indoor soccer match the night before tryouts, he blew out his knee requiring surgery on his ACL and meniscus. He attended The Master's College in California with a major in Bible and Theology and played on their soccer team. In his second year, he changed his major to Law. In May 2001, Lee went into the United States Navy with a contract to try out for the SEALs.

== Military career ==
Lee completed United States Navy basic training at RTC Great Lakes, Illinois in July 2001, followed by Aviation Ordnanceman School at NATTC Pensacola, Florida in October 2001. Lee then reported to Basic Underwater Demolition/Sea, Air, Land (BUD/S) training at Coronado, California, but dropped from the program and was reassigned to the aircraft carrier USS Dwight D. Eisenhower (CVN-69) from 2002 to March 2004. Lee attempted BUD/S again in 2004 and successfully graduated from class 251. After completing SEAL Qualification training in May 2005, Lee was assigned to SEAL Team THREE. Lee deployed to Iraq with Charlie Platoon, Task Unit Bruiser in May 2006 until he was killed in action in Ramadi on August 2, 2006.

Lee was the first Navy SEAL killed in combat during Operation Iraqi Freedom. A fellow SEAL Team 3 member, Ryan "Biggles" Job, was critically injured by a sniper and Lee single-handedly provided cover fire while other team members prepared Job for medical evacuation. The team re-engaged the enemy force after the evacuation of Job. Lee was mortally wounded when he exposed himself a third time to draw fire from enemy forces away from his teammates. For his action on the battlefield, Lee was posthumously awarded the Silver Star, the Bronze Star Medal with Valor and the Purple Heart. His Silver Star citation reads:

The President of the United States of America takes pride in presenting the Silver Star (Posthumously) to Aviation Ordnanceman Second Class Marc Alan Lee, United States Navy, for conspicuous gallantry and intrepidity in action against the enemy as Assaulter and Automatic Weapons Gunner in Sea, Air, Land Team THREE (SEAL-3), Naval Special Warfare Task Group Arabian Peninsula in support of Operation IRAQI FREEDOM on 2 August 2006. Petty Officer Lee conducted clearance operations in South-Central Ramadi as a member of a Naval Special Warfare Combat Advisory element for the Iraqi Army. During the operation, one element member was wounded by enemy fire. The element completed the casualty evacuation, regrouped and returned onto the battlefield to continue the fight. Petty Officer Lee and his SEAL element maneuvered to assault an identified enemy position. He, his teammates, Bradley Fighting Vehicles and Abrams tanks engaged enemy positions with suppressive fire. During the assault, his team came under heavy enemy fire from an adjacent building to the north. To protect the lives of his teammates, he fearlessly exposed himself to direct enemy fire by engaging the enemy with his machine gun and was mortally wounded in the engagement. His brave actions in the line of fire saved the lives of many of his teammates. Petty Officer Lee's courageous leadership, operational skill, and selfless dedication to duty, reflected great credit upon him and were in keeping with the highest traditions of the United States Naval Service. Action Date: August 2, 2006

Job survived his wounds but was left permanently blind. In September 2009, Job died from a preventable hospital error while his wife was pregnant with their first child, Leah.

=== Awards and decorations ===
U.S. military decorations
Silver Star
Bronze Star Medal with w/ "V" device
Purple Heart
Combat Action Ribbon
Navy Meritorious Unit Commendation
Good Conduct Medal
U.S. Service (Campaign) Medals and Service and Training Ribbons
National Defense Service Medal
Iraq Campaign Medal with bronze campaign star
Global War on Terrorism Expeditionary Medal
Global War on Terrorism Service Medal
Navy Sea Service Deployment Ribbon
Navy Rifle Marksmanship Badge
Navy Pistol Marksmanship Badge

U.S. badges, patches and tabs
SEAL Trident
Navy and Marine Corps Parachutist Insignia

== Popular culture ==
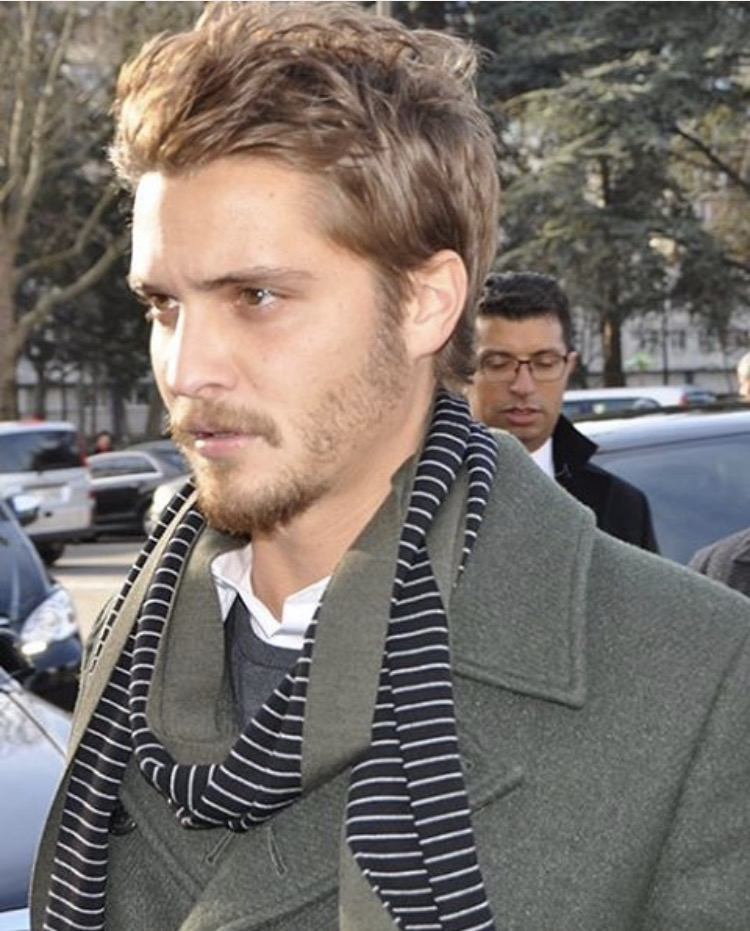
Luke Grimes portrayed Marc Alan Lee in American Sniper (2014)

Lee was portrayed by actor Luke Grimes in the 2014 film American Sniper. Lee's name was also shown on a badge hanging on the wall for tribute in the movie Lone Survivor. The fourth episode of the History Channel's The Warfighters is about Lee, portrayed by actor Trevor Fox, and his Platoon during the Battle of Ramadi.

== See also ==
- List of United States Navy SEALs
