= List of programs broadcast by Cosmopolitan TV (Canadian TV channel) =

This is a list of television programs formerly broadcast by the defunct Canadian television channel Cosmopolitan TV.

== Final programming ==
This was a list of programs being broadcast regularly:

- Come Dine with Me Canada
- Crazy Ex-Girlfriend
- Ghost Whisperer
- Happy Endings
- Love Trap
- Oh So Cosmo
- Sex and the City
- Style By Jury
- The Vampire Diaries

== Former programming ==
- Abbey & Janice: Beauty and the Best
- The Agency
- All on the Line
- American Princess
- Anna and Kristina's Beauty Call
- The Bachelor
- The Bachelor Pad
- The Bachelorette
- Bachelorette Party
- Bachelorette Party: Las Vegas
- Baggage
- Beach Girls
- Beautiful People
- Between The Sheets
- Cashmere Mafia
- Charlotte & Jordan: Runway to LA
- Charmed
- The Class
- Cold Case
- Cougar Town
- Dawson's Creek
- Dirty Cows
- Dirty Sexy Money
- Double Exposure
- Excused
- Extreme Celebrities
- Fashion File
- Felicity
- Gilmore Girls
- Glam Fairy
- High Society
- Holidate
- Hollywood's 10 Best
- House of Glam
- It's a Brad, Brad World
- Jerseylicious
- Just Married
- Kell on Earth
- Ladette to Lady
- Love Broker
- Love, Inc.
- Make Me A Supermodel
- Manhattan Matchmaker
- Men in Trees
- Miss Match
- A Model Life
- Models NYC
- Nail Files
- The Opposite of Sex
- The Rachel Zoe Project
- Rags to Red Carpet
- Rules of Engagement
- Samantha Who?
- Sex Tips for Girls
- Single Girl Diaries
- Single in South Beach
- The Smart Woman Survival Guide
- Snapped
- Sophie
- StyleOgraphy ..
- Tough Love Miami
- Tough Love New Orleans
- The Truth About the Sexes
- Ugly Betty
- Veronica Mars
- A View From The Top
- Will & Grace
- The World According to Paris
