= Éder Saúl López =

Mexican actor, stunt man, and model

Éder Saúl López is a Mexican actor, stunt man, and model. He started his career as an actor in several telenovelas. He has also appeared in several commercials for companies like Jack in the Box and Carl's Jr. for Spanish speaking channels like Univision.

== Filmography ==
Film
Year	Title	Role	Notes
2013	Slightly Single in L.A.	Club Patron (uncredited)	
2013	The Brides of Sodom	Satroi	
2011	II The Restaurant (Short)	Puerto Rican Juan	
2011	Getting That Girl	Party Guy	
2011	Balls to the Wall	Chippendale Contestant (uncredited)	
2011	Exodus Fall	Bus Passenger	
2011	Fig (Short)	Prisoner	
2010	Big Bundle of Joy (Short)	Paulito	
2010	Coyote (Short)	Party Guy	
2010	Friends (Short)	Blair	
2010	X-Treme Love (Short)	Miguel	
2010	Across the Line: The Exodus of Charlie Wright (Video)	Dead Body	
2010	GhettoPhysics	Student	
2010	The Confidant	Prisoner (uncredited)	
2010	The Binds That Tie Us (Short)	Kristos	
2010	Deadliest Warrior (TV Series)	Aztec Warrior Expert - Aztec Jaguar vs. Zande Warrior	Aztec Warrior Expert
2010	Tough Love Couples (TV Series)	Tempter Temptation, Temptation (2010) ... Tempter	
2010	The Back-up Plan	Fitness Trainer (uncredited)	
2010	The Space Between	Pilot	
2010	Locked Away	Bar Guy	
2009-2010	Tough Love (TV Series)	Hot Guy,Promises, Promises (2010),Hot Guy. Away We Go! (2010),Hot Guy. Ghosts of Dating Future (2010),Hot Guy. Revenge of the Exes (2010),Hot Guy. You Can't Handle the Truth (2009), Hot Guy. The Wow Factor (2009),Hot Guy. Sex, Lies and Boot Camp (2009),Hot Guy. Welcome to Boot Camp (2009), Hot Guy.	
2010	Treasure of the Black Jaguar	Bar Thug	
2009	Finding a Place (Short)	Bass player	
2009	Thanks for Dying	Chet's Assistant	
2009	Santo Pecado (Short)	Marco / Santiago	
2009	Enemies Closer Pilot (Video short)	Houston	
2009	Surviving Disaster (TV Series)	Pilot Hijacker - Hijack (2009) Pilot Hijacker	
2009	116 Seconds (Short)	Carmelo / Thick & Juicy (as Eder Saúl López Garcia)	
2009	Hollywood, je t'aime	Cafe Patron	
2009	Year One	Caveman (uncredited)	
2009	King of the Streets (Video)	Canadian Drug Dealer	
2009	Secretos (TV Series)	Mauricio Zetina - 'Enredadera' (2009) ... Mauricio Zetina	
2009	Angels & Demons	Italian Citizen (uncredited)	
2009	The First Impression (Short)	Hot Boyfriend (as Eder Sual Lopez)	
2009	True Jackson, VP (TV Series)	Model	
2009	True Takes Iceland	Model (uncredited)	
2008	Yes Man	Nude Conventioner (uncredited)	
Stunts (2 credits)
2009	Surviving Disaster (TV Series)	(stunt performer - 1 episode) - Hijack (2009) stunt performer: Pilot Hijacker - uncredited	
2009	The Fighter	stunt double: Leone	
Miscellaneous Crew (1 credit)
2009	Angels & Demons	photo double: Inspector Olivetti	
Self (3 credits)
2010	Heatherbrained! (TV Series)	Himself	
2008	The Janice Dickinson Modeling Agency (TV Series documentary)	Model	
2008	New Beginning	Model	
2007	Suegras (TV Series)	Himself	
