= Tough Love season 2 =

Tough Love
- Season 2
- Starring: Steven Ward; JoAnn Ward
- No. of episodes: 11

Release
- Original network: VH1
- Original release: November 15, 2009 – January 31, 2010

Season chronology
- ← Previous; Season 1 Next → Tough Love Couples

Tough Love (season 2) is the second season of the American reality television series Tough Love, which first aired on VH1. The show features nine women seeking relationship advice from the host and matchmaker, Steven Ward, and his mother, JoAnn Ward, both of the Philadelphia-based Master Matchmakers.

== Contestants ==
Name	Age	Title
Alicia	31	Miss Last Call
Angel Moore	25	Miss Closed Off
Elizabeth "Liz" Richards	24	Miss Wedding Belle
Jenna Santana	26	Miss Body Issues
Kanisha Johnson	26	Miss Gold Digger
Melissa "Rocky" Brasselle	44	Miss Off Her Rocker
Sally	22	Miss Lonely
Taylor Royce	26	Miss Second Chance
Tina Hunter	37	Miss Career Obsessed

=== Notes ===
- Taylor Royce appeared on the first season of Tough Love and returns to the cast this season.
- Kanisha Johnson appeared on the Tyra Banks Show and on the 2008 CW series Farmer Wants a Wife. She also made an appearance on an episode of Judge Pirro, suing friend Jessie Lewis IV for an unpaid loan. Recently, she appeared on Divorce Court (10/26/2010) accusing her (ex)husband of cheating with her best friend and spending her money without her knowledge.
- Melissa "Rocky" Brasselle appeared on the 2008 VH1 series I Know My Kid's a Star with her daughter, Hayley. She introduces herself to her dates as Rocky or Raquel, not Melissa. She also goes by the name Rocky DeMarco.
- Angel Moore appeared on LA Ink on Oct. 13, shown getting a tattoo by Ruthless on the episode "The Missing Piece".

== Episode Progress ==
Contestants	Episodes									
Contestants	1	2	3	4	5	6	7	8	9	10
Alicia	AVG	AVG	AVG	AVG	HIGH	WORST	AVG	AVG	AVG	GOOD
Angel	POOR	WORST	AVG	BEST	AVG	AVG	POOR	HIGH	AVG	GOOD
Jenna	AVG	HIGH	POOR	AVG	WORST	BEST	AVG	WORST	AVG	GOOD
Kanisha	WORST	HIGH	AVG	AVG	AVG	AVG	AVG	BEST	AVG	GOOD
Liz	BEST	HIGH	AVG	AVG	AVG	AVG	WORST	HIGH	AVG	GOOD
Rocky	POOR	BEST	AVG	AVG	AVG	AVG	AVG	AVG	BEST	GOOD
Sally	AVG	AVG	BEST	AVG	AVG	AVG	BEST	AVG	AVG	GOOD
Taylor	BACK	HIGH	WORST	WORST	BEST	AVG	POOR	AVG	WORST	GOOD
Tina	AVG	AVG	WORST	AVG	AVG	AVG	AVG	HIGH	AVG	GOOD

The contestant had the best progress/date of the week.
The contestant was commended for good progress/date.
The contestant had average progress/date.
The contestant had poor progress/date.
The contestant had the worst progress/date of the week.
The contestant had good progress and was in the hot seat.
The contestant returned from the previous season after leaving and was included later in the episode.

== Episodes ==
=== Episode 1 ===
First aired November 15, 2009

- Challenge: First Impression
- Challenge Winner: Liz
- Weakest Participant: Kanisha
- Episode Notes:

Taylor from last season returns to boot camp at the end of the episode. Unlike last season, she no longer holds the title of "Miss Gold Digger."

=== Episode 2 ===
First aired November 22, 2009

- Challenge: Communication
- Challenge Winner: Rocky
- Weakest Participant: Angel

=== Episode 3 ===
First aired November 29, 2009

- Challenge: Sexiness
- Challenge Winner: Sally
- Weakest Participants: Tina & Taylor
- Episode Notes:

This was the first time that two people were put on the hot seat.

=== Episode 4 ===
First aired December 6, 2009

- Challenge: Parental Skills
- Challenge Winner: Angel
- Weakest Participant: Taylor
- Episode Notes:

Liz decided to break up with Dave, whom she met in Episode 1.

Alicia decided to end her relationship with Jeff after Steve claimed that Jeff "is just not that into you."

Angel tells Adam about her son and her way of providing for him.

=== Episode 5 ===
First aired December 13, 2009

- Challenge: The WOW Factor
- Challenge Winner: Taylor
- Weakest Participant: Jenna

=== Episode 6 ===
First aired December 20, 2009

- Challenge: You Can't Handle the Truth
- Challenge Winner: Jenna
- Weakest Participant: Alicia

=== Episode 7 ===
First aired January 3, 2010

- Challenge: Money Can't Buy me Love
- Challenge Winner: Sally
- Weakest Participant: Liz

=== Episode 8 ===
First aired January 10, 2010

- Challenge: Revenge of the Exes
- Challenge Winner: Kanisha
- Weakest Participant: Jenna
- Episode Notes:

Liz got back together with Dave in this episode, whom she previously broke up with in Episode 4. Angel confronted her fears about telling her parents about her exotic dancing, while Adam helped her through it. At the end of the episode, Steve decides to "do things differently" and added an extra seat next to Jenna for Jeremy. The show ended on that cliffhanger.

=== Episode 9 ===
First aired January 17, 2010

- Challenge: Ghosts of Dating Future
- Challenge Winner: Rocky
- Weakest Participant: Taylor

=== Episode 10 ===
First aired January 24, 2010

- Challenge: Away We Go

== Episode 11 (Season Finale) ==
Best: Angel
