= Combat Missions =

- Genre: Reality
- Presented by: Rudy Boesch
- Country of origin: United States
- Original language: English
- No. of seasons: 1
- No. of episodes: 15

Production
- Production locations: Mojave Desert, California, United States
- Running time: 60 minutes
- Production company: Mark Burnett Productions

Original release
- Network: USA
- Release: January 16 – April 17, 2002

Combat Missions is an American reality television series produced by Mark Burnett and hosted by former Survivor castaway Rudy Boesch that aired from January 16 to April 17, 2002 on the USA Network. It pits four teams of highly experienced military and police operatives against each other in physical challenges and "mission" scenarios. Each team has a call sign and corresponding color. The four teams are Alpha (Red), Bravo (Blue), Charlie (Yellow) and Delta (Green). The team members were past and present members of SWAT, the United States Army Special Forces, the Navy SEALs, Marine Recon, the CIA Special Operations Group, Delta Force, and the U.S. Army Rangers. The mission scenarios has each team face off against the opposing "Shadow force" (not another team) using MILES gear in real-life combat situations. The show was not picked up for a second season.

Scott Helvenston, one of the contestants from the Delta team went on to work for Blackwater USA in Iraq after the show and was killed in action on March 31, 2004.

== Competition ==
The four squads in the competition are all unique.

Alpha Squad: The young guns mainly with SEAL backgrounds.

Bravo Squad: Urban assault consisting mainly of SWAT cops.

Charlie Squad: The "Over the Hill" club. Majority of the teammates are in their 40s and one in their 50s.

Delta Squad: The oddballs including prankster Rod Nutter and Baz who works for the CIA.

Each of the four squads starts the competition with six players. The 15-week contest—each week referred to as an "Evolution"—is split into three rounds. During each evolution two squads are chosen to go head to head, first in a training exercise and then in a combat mission.

At the start of each evolution, all four squads are required to fall in formation when ordered and to report that each squad member is present. Rudy Boesch will then tell them which two squads are going head to head during that evolution and may even add some additional information such as the weather condition for the day or a brief introduction of any new team members that have joined the squad.

Training exercises are usually physical challenges, including climbing, swimming, running and shooting. The winning squad receives extra points towards that week's mission.

The combat mission pits those two same squads into separate but identical situations against "Shadow Squad", who are also highly trained, in a combat-like scenario, some military in nature, some SWAT-related. Both squads start out with 1000 points, plus whatever point bonus was earned by the winner of the training mission. Points are then deducted for team members killed during the mission (50 points for each team member) and time taken in the mission itself (5 points per minute). Failure to complete all mandatory objectives, or the death of all team members results in a "total mission failure." There may be additional objectives given during the mission and will result in further point deductions if not completed (e.g. Evolutions 7 and 8 required the squads to secure an undercover ATF agent. Failure to secure him resulted in a 100-point penalty).

After both squads have a run at the mission, they will be summoned to the briefing room where their results will be scored. Whichever squad has the most points wins and their squad stays intact. The losing squad will have 10 minutes to pack their gear and report to the discharge room.

For the first twelve evolutions, the team with the lower score was obligated to discharge a teammate. The choice for discharge would be selected either by vote or, in case of a tie or refusal, drawing swords until one man pulls one with a red tip; that man would be discharged. For the first six evolutions, the teammate who is being discharged will stay in the discharge room while the rest of the team headed into the dossier room to select a replacement. The squad has 10 minutes to decide on whom to select. From evolution 7-10, lost players were no longer replaced, severely weakening the losing squads. If a team member from any squad during Evolutions 7-10 has an injury or illness that prevents him from continuing in the competition, they may voluntarily be discharged and the squad can go into the dossier room to find a replacement. During the last phase, the entire losing squad was kicked off in order to determine the overall winning squad. After that squad (Bravo) was selected, it was split into two teams of 3 who faced off. From those 3 remaining players one was eliminated in a Training Exercise, and the final two faced off in a mission in order to select the Combat Missions individual champion.

During the discharge ceremony at the end of each evolution, the three squads (2 squads that didn't compete during that evolution and the winning squad) fell in formation (similar to the beginning of each evolution). The remaining squad members of the losing squad assemble up front waiting for their discharged teammate to exit the discharge room. Once the discharged teammate comes out of the room, Rudy Boesch commends him and renders him a salute and officially dismisses him from the camp. His teammates also say goodbye to him as he walks out. A vehicle will pull up outside the camp gates to collect him. During evolutions 1-6, the same vehicle will drop off a teammate whom the losing squad chose in the dossier room. Evolutions 7-10 will have the vehicle collect the discharged teammate only. Evolutions 11-13 will have 2 vehicles pull up to collect the discharged squad and evolutions 14 and 15 will have a vehicle that will collect the losing teammates from the championship squad until 2 are left.

When the new teammate enters the camp, he will immediately go to Rudy to report for duty. Rudy welcomes him and tells him which squad he is assigned to. Then the order to fall out is given which concludes the discharge ceremony and this officially ends each evolution.

== Contestants ==
Name	Team	Background	Notes
Mark Jackson	Alpha	SWAT	Whole-Team Discharge (Evolution 12)
Scott Oates	Alpha	Navy SEALs	Whole-Team Discharge (Evolution 12)
Mell Spicer	Alpha	Navy SEALs	Whole-Team Discharge (Evolution 12)
Daniel Patrick O'Shea	Alpha	Navy SEALs	Voted Off (Evolution 7) No Replacement
Frank Monestere	Alpha	Special Forces	Voted Off (Evolution 6) Replaced by Eric Johnson
Chris Pate	Alpha	SWAT	Voted Off (Evolution 2) Replaced by Harald Zundel
Harald Zundel	Alpha	Navy SEALs	Replaced Pate (Evolution 2); Whole-Team Discharge (Evolution 12)
Eric Johnson	Alpha	Navy SEALs	Replaced Monestere (Evolution 6); Voted Off (Evolution 9) No Replacement
Dexter Fletcher	Bravo	SWAT	Combat Missions Champion
Jeff Byers	Bravo	Navy SEALs	Third Place, lost the marksmanship challenge
Steve Claggett	Bravo	SWAT	Lost the three-on-three team challenge
Mark Corwin	Bravo	Marine Force Recon	Lost the three-on-three team challenge
Bob Kain	Bravo	SWAT	Second Place, lost against Fletcher
Sean Sirker	Bravo	Special Forces	Replaced Taylor (Evolution 8); Lost the three-on-three team challenge
Jody Taylor	Bravo	SWAT	Medical Discharge (Evolution 8) Replaced by Sean Sirker
Cade Courtley	Charlie	Navy SEALs	Replaced Potter (Evolution 4); Whole-Team Discharge (Evolution 11)
Ken Greaves	Charlie	Navy SEALs	Whole-Team Discharge (Evolution 11)
Justin Young	Charlie	Marine Recon	Whole-Team Discharge (Evolution 11)
Jeff Everage	Charlie	Navy SEALs	Drew Red-Tipped Sword (Evolution 1) Replaced by Wilson Wong
John Potter	Charlie	Navy SEALs	Voted Off (Evolution 4) Replaced by Cade Courtley
Edward Bugarin	Charlie	Special Forces, Delta Force	Voted Off (Evolution 5) Replaced by Jonathan Weber
Wilson Wong	Charlie	SWAT	Replaced Everage (Evolution 1); Discharged Self (Evolution 8) No Replacement
Ossie Crenshaw	Charlie	SWAT	Voted Off (Evolution 10) No Replacement
Jonathan Weber	Charlie	Marine Force Recon	Replaced Bugarin (Evolution 5); Whole-Team Discharge (Evolution 11)
Baz	Delta	CIA/US Marines	Whole-Team Discharge (Evolution 13)
George Ciganik	Delta	Marine Recon, SWAT	Replaced Teeple (Evolution 3); Whole-Team Discharge (Evolution 13)
Scott Helvenston	Delta	Navy SEALs	Whole-Team Discharge (Evolution 13)
Rodney Nutter	Delta	Marine Force Recon	Whole-Team Discharge (Evolution 13)
John Winn	Delta	Marine Force Recon	Whole-Team Discharge (Evolution 13)
William Nissen	Delta	Army Rangers	Replaced Estadt (Evolution 12); Whole-Team Discharge (Evolution 13)
Rod Teeple	Delta	Navy SEALs	Discharged Self (Evolution 3) Replaced by George Ciganik
Garth Estadt	Delta	Special Forces	Medical Discharge (Evolution 12) Replaced by William Nissen

The following is a list of contestants from the "Dossier Room" who never got picked to play:

Name	Background
John Barnes	SWAT
Carey Lasiter	Delta Force
Patrick Miller	SWAT
Benjamin Victor	Marine Force Recon
Keith Vinski	Navy SEALs
Howard Wasdin	Navy SEALs

== Round 1: Episodes 1-6 ==
(Start of Round 1: Lose the mission, lose a man and proceed to the dossier room to replace him.)

=== Evolution 1: Tank Takeout ===
Bravo vs. Charlie

Prior to the competition, all squads underwent physical training. Started off with a 3-mile run, followed by a 2-lap rucksack run (50 pounds) around the base, and then as many pullups they can do.

Training Exercise: Log Carry From Hell (25 Bonus Points toward Mission)

Both teams must carry a 500-pound log around an obstacle course. Every 15 minutes, each team must drop a man. The first team to drop the log loses. Winner: Bravo

Mission: Tank Takeout

Objective is to destroy the tank with an explosive device. Both teams will be inserted via helicopter and make their way on foot to the tank and then plant the explosive device to destroy the tank. Surviving members will then make their way to the extraction point for helicopter extract.

Charlie got ambushed early but were able to fend off the initial assault with no casualties. As they got near the tank Young was killed when two shadow squad members emerged from a bunker. Krenshaw and Greaves were killed as they approached the tank but Everadge was able to take out the two members inside the tank. Everadge was then killed as he tried to approach the tank. Potter was then killed as he planted the explosive charges leaving Bugarin the lone survivor.

Early into the mission, Bravo lost one SEAL and one Marine but the remaining four SWAT cops on the team were able to complete the mission (notably Jody Taylor with 7 kills) despite the mission being SEAL in nature.

In the Dossier room, Charlie struggled to select a teammate to discharge prompting Rudy Boesch to issue them an ultimatum: Five minutes to choose a member to discharge or draw swords. Charlie eventually decided to draw swords resulting in Jeff Everage's discharge (ironically Everage was against drawing swords).

Teams	Into Mission	Dead (50 point penalty)	Time (5 point penalty)	Score	Result
Bravo	1025	-200 (4 dead)	-175 (35 minutes)	650	WINNERS
Charlie	1000	-250 (5 dead)	-180 (36 minutes)	570	Lose Everage, gain Wong

=== Evolution 2: Tank Takeout ===
Alpha vs. Delta

Training Exercise: Helocasting (50 Bonus Points toward Mission)

The teams took turns jumping from a hovering helicopter into the water and swimming to shore. Winner: Alpha

Mission: Tank Takeout

Objective is to destroy the tank with an explosive device. Both teams will be inserted via helicopter and make their way on foot to the tank and then plant the explosive device to destroy the tank. Surviving members will then make their way to the extraction point for helicopter extract.

Rod Teeple (Team leader for Delta) advanced to the tank without the explosive charge and ignored pleas from his teammates to fall back as they have not yet cleared the tank. This led to two unnecessary deaths (Teeple and Winn).

Chris Pate from Alpha squad struggled on the hill climb resulting in unnecessary time wasted which was a factor in his discharge. Alpha destroyed the tank with all their men alive, but Shadow Squad prepared an ambush for them as they were moving to the extraction point resulting in five of the six team members killed. (Scott Oates was the lone survivor)

Teams	Into Mission	Dead (50 point penalty)	Time (5 point penalty)	Score	Result
Delta	1000	-150 (3 dead)	-155 (31 minutes)	695	WINNERS
Alpha	1050	-250 (5 dead)	-110 (22 minutes)	690	Lose Pate, gain Zundel

=== Evolution 3: Prisoner Rescue ===
Bravo vs. Delta

Training Exercise: Weapons Assembly (25 Bonus Points toward Mission)

Each team must assemble and fire six different weapons. First team to successfully assemble and fire all six weapons wins. Winner: Delta

Training Exercise: The Gauntlet (50 Bonus Points toward Mission)

The team that clears the gauntlet (four players from opposing team), by knocking them into the water, with the fewest men wins. Winner: Delta

Mission: Prisoner Rescue

An American prisoner is being transported in a truck clearly marked with the number 13. There is an armed checkpoint on the road the truck will travel through. The objective is to ambush the truck and rescue the prisoner. In each mission scenario, truck 13 overheated and was overtaken by truck 23.

Jeff Byers from Bravo squad asked a good question during the briefing (are there similar trucks traveling that road?) which led them to be the only squad not to ambush the truck that reached the checkpoint first (marked with a 23), resulting in fewer enemies to deal with. Not surprisingly all six of their team members survived.

Rod Teeple (Team Leader from Delta) took personal responsibility for their Total Mission Failure and discharged himself prior to voting.

Teams	Into Mission	Dead (50 point penalty)	Time (5 point penalty)	Score	Result
Bravo	1000	0 (0 dead)	-95 (19 minutes)	905	WINNERS
Delta	1075	Total Mission Failure		0	Lose Teeple, gain Ciganik

=== Evolution 4: Prisoner Rescue ===
Alpha vs. Charlie

Training Exercise: The Grid (75 Bonus Points toward Mission)

Both teams start on opposite corners of a grid which floats on water and be the first team to knock all opposing team members into the water. Winner: Alpha

Mission: Prisoner Rescue

An American prisoner is being transported in a truck clearly marked with the number 13. There is an armed checkpoint on the road the truck will travel through. The objective is to ambush the truck and rescue the prisoner. In each mission scenario, truck 13 overheated and was overtaken by truck 23.

Ed Bugarin from Charlie squad had 7 kills and personally carried the team.

Teams	Into Mission	Dead (50 point penalty)	Time (5 point penalty)	Score	Result
Alpha	1075	-50 (1 dead)	-100 (20 minutes)	925	WINNERS
Charlie	1000	-200 (4 dead)	-190 (38 minutes)	610	Lose Potter, gain Courtley

=== Evolution 5: Hostage Rescue ===
Charlie vs. Delta

Training Exercise: Double Pit Cross (50 Bonus Points toward Mission)

During the water portion of the exercise, Ossie Crenshaw blacked out as his muscles seized up on him. Ed Bugarin, Cade Courtley and Wilson Wong helped him out. Winner: Delta

Mission: Hostage Rescue

Mission objective is to rescue a hostage using Close Quarter Battle (CQB) techniques. Local TV anchorwoman, Linda Morris, has been taken hostage by two individuals with AK-47s, she was shot in the leg. Suspects are in an apartment building. One member of the team will relieve the police officer on the scene and serve as an observation post. The clock will stop when the team successfully rescues the hostage and takes her to a waiting ambulance. There will be a 50-point deduction if any innocents are shot and killed (They are wearing MILES gear). During the mission, there was a 2nd hidden sniper lying in wait as the teams made their way out of the apartment building with their hostage.

Charlie suffered casualties as they were exiting the apartment building with their hostage.

Rodney Nutter of Delta squad had outstanding sharpshooting skills which came in handy as he was the situated at the observation post for the team. As a result, none of his teammates were killed during the mission.

Teams	Into Mission	Dead (50 point penalty)	Time (5 point penalty)	Score	Result
Delta	1050	0 (0 dead)	-85 (17 minutes)	965	WINNERS
Charlie	1000	-200 (4 dead)	-50 (10 minutes)	750	Lose Bugarin, gain Weber

=== Evolution 6: Hostage Rescue ===
Alpha vs. Bravo

Training Exercise: Obstacle Course (50 Bonus Points toward Mission)

Jody Taylor injured his knee on the cargo net. Winner: Alpha

Mission: Hostage Rescue

Mission objective is to rescue a hostage using Close Quarter Battle (CQB) techniques. Local TV anchorwoman, Linda Morris, has been taken hostage by two individuals with AK-47s, she was shot in the leg. Suspects are in an apartment building. One member of the team will relieve the police officer on the scene and serve as an observation post. The clock will stop when the team successfully rescues the hostage and takes her to a waiting ambulance. There will be a 50-point deduction if any innocents are shot and killed (They are wearing MILES gear). During the mission, there was a 2nd hidden sniper lying in wait as the teams made their way out of the apartment building with their hostage.

This mission was suited for Bravo being SWAT in nature. Jody Taylor was the lone casualty as the team exited the apartment building thanks to the hidden sniper.

Harald Zundel had good observation skills as the team exited the apartment building and was able to engage the hidden sniper allowing the team to escape unscathed.

Teams	Into Mission	Dead (50 point penalty)	Time (5 point penalty)	Score	Result
Bravo	1000	-50 (1 dead)	-30 (6 minutes)	920	WINNERS
Alpha	1050	-50 (1 dead)	-45 (9 minutes)	705*	Lose Monestere, gain Johnson

- Alpha lost 250 points for cheating. They used a poncho to cover the hostage and defeat the purpose of the MILES laser gear which was against the rules. Then they lied when asked why they did it, offering the excuse that they were "treating for shock". Daniel Patrick O'Shea (team leader for Alpha) later admitted that it was his decision to use the poncho. (Alpha would have defeated Bravo by 35 points if they didn't cheat)

=== Leaderboard after Round 1 ===
Teams	Wins	Losses
Bravo	3	0
Delta	2	1
Alpha	1	2
Charlie	0	3

== Round 2: Episodes 7-10 ==
(Start of Round 2: Teams who discharge a man through losing a mission may not get a replacement unless it is a medical discharge.)

=== Evolution 7: Pilot Down ===
Alpha vs. Delta

During this episode, Scott Helvenston played the role of a pest getting under the skin of some Alpha team members (notably Mel Spicer and Daniel O'Shea) during the Training Exercises. It got so bad that all four teams had an informal meeting at the Snake Pit with Rudy Boesch and other senior ranking officials. Members of Alpha confronted Helvenston whom they believe has gone too far in poor sportsmanship and creating a bad reputation among the SEALS.

Training Exercise: Rifle Marksmanship (25 Bonus Points toward Mission)

Each team will have a target to shoot at with the objective of aiming at the bulls eye. The highest number of bulls-eyes wins. Winner: Delta

Training Exercise: The Grid (50 Bonus Points toward Mission)

First and second matches were nullified due to excessive grabbing. This event was the breaking point between Delta's Helvenston and Alpha team. Winner: Delta

Mission: Pilot Down

Mission objective is to rescue a downed pilot before the enemy finds him. The pilot has ejected and still alive. The enemy (Shadow Squad) is looking for the pilot and they can be reinforced within 30 minutes by ground transportation. All teams were instructed to move to the primary extract point after pilot is secured and call headquarters for extract. If the primary extract point is compromised, they must move to an alternate extract point specified by headquarters. In each mission scenario, the primary extract point was compromised as a Shadow Squad member would shoot down the helicopter scheduled to collect the team with their hostage.

Alpha got ambushed by Shadow Squad as they moved to their alternate extract point resulting in casualties.

Teams	Into Mission	Dead (50 point penalty)	Time (5 point penalty)	Score	Result
Delta	1075	-50 (1 dead)	-160 (32 minutes)	865	WINNERS
Alpha	1000	-200 (4 dead)	-140 (28 minutes)	660	Lose O'Shea (5 men left)

=== Evolution 8: Pilot Down ===
Bravo vs. Charlie

Training Exercise: Helocasting (75 Bonus Points toward Mission) The teams jumped from a hovering helicopter into the water, swam to a zodiac boat, and paddled to shore. Winner: Charlie

Mission: Pilot Down

Mission objective is to rescue a downed pilot before the enemy finds him. The pilot has ejected and still alive. The enemy (Shadow Squad) is looking for the pilot and they can be reinforced within 30 minutes by ground transportation. All teams were instructed to move to the primary extract point after pilot is secured and call headquarters for extract. If the primary extract point is compromised, they must move to an alternate extract point specified by headquarters. In each mission scenario, the primary extract point was compromised as a Shadow Squad member would shoot down the helicopter scheduled to collect the team with their hostage.

Though Bravo team won, Taylor was medically discharged and replaced with Sirker.

Teams	Into Mission	Dead (50 point penalty)	Time (5 point penalty)	Score	Result
Bravo	1000	0 (0 dead)	-75 (15 minutes)	925	WINNERS
Charlie	1075	-50 (1 dead)	-110 (22 minutes)	915	Lose Wong (5 men left)

=== Evolution 9: Missile Hangar ===
Alpha vs. Bravo

Training Exercise: Rope Climb (25 Bonus Points toward Mission)

Five team members will climb a rope one at a time carrying a 40-pound pack, then come down the rope and enter a bunker and fire a weapon and return to their teammates. Winner: Alpha

Training Exercise: Double Pit Cross (50 Bonus Points toward Mission)

Five team members from each team run two laps around a couse including a rope bridge over water. Winner: Alpha

Mission: Missile Hangar

The objective is to retrieve a missile guidance system that is held inside a hangar currently used by a terrorist group. They will be inserted via helicopter on the roof of the hangar. They must first disable the enemies satellite communication dish and set an explosive device. Once the charge is set they must radio headquarters telling them they have accomplished this objective. They will then rappel into the hangar to retrieve the guidance system while repelling the enemy using Close Quarters Battle (CQB) techniques. The helicopter will be waiting outside the south doors of the hangar. During the mission, once they have confirmed disabling the satellite communication dish, headquarters will tell them that there is an undercover ATF agent, Todd Nelson, whom they need to secure. They are given his description (Caucasian, 5'10, 175 lbs, receding hairline, has a mustache and wears glasses). If they fail to secure him, they will lose 100 points.

Bravo killed the undercover ATF agent off the bat and ended up securing the wrong man. They asked the man if he was an undercover agent to which the man replied in the negative. They took him anyway.

Harald Zundel cut his nose as he was rappelling into the hangar.

Teams	Into Mission	Dead (50 point penalty)	Mission Objective (100 point penalty)	Time (5 point penalty)	Score	Result
Bravo	1000	-100 (2 dead)	-100 (Killed ATF Agent)	-40 (8 minutes)	760	WINNERS
Alpha	1075	-200 (4 dead)	-100 (Failed to secure ATF Agent)	-55 (11 minutes)	720	Lose Johnson (4 men left)

=== Evolution 10: Missile Hangar ===
Charlie vs. Delta

Evolution Training Exercise: Obstacle Course (50 Bonus Points toward Mission)

Winner: Delta

Training Exercise: Transition Drill (25 Bonus Points toward Mission)

Four shooters are armed with an M4 with only one round, the last shooter has an M9 pistol with a full magazine. The first team to drop all five targets in order from front to rear wins. Winner: Charlie

Mission: Missile Hangar

The objective is to retrieve a missile guidance system that is held inside a hangar currently used by a terrorist group. They will be inserted via helicopter on the roof of the hangar. They must first disable the enemies satellite communication dish and set an explosive device. Once the charge is set they must radio headquarters telling them they have accomplished this objective. They will then rappel into the hangar to retrieve the guidance system while repelling the enemy using Close Quarters Battle (CQB) techniques. The helicopter will be waiting outside the south doors of the hangar. During the mission, once they have confirmed disabling the satellite communication dish, headquarters will tell them that there is an undercover ATF agent, Todd Nelson, whom they need to secure. They are given his description (Caucasian, 5'10, 175 lbs, receding hairline, has a mustache and wears glasses). If they fail to secure him, they will lose 100 points.

Teams	Into Mission	Dead (50 point penalty)	Mission Objective (100 point penalty)	Time (5 point penalty)	Score	Result
Delta	1050	-150 (3 dead)	0 (Successfully Secured ATF Agent)	-65 (13 minutes)	835	WINNERS
Charlie	1025	Total Mission Failure			0	Lose Crenshaw (4 men left)

=== Leaderboard after Round 2 ===
Teams	Wins	Losses	Strength
Bravo	5	0	6 men
Delta	4	1	6 men
Alpha	1	4	4 men
Charlie	0	5	4 men

== Round 3: Episodes 11-15 ==
(Start of Round 3: Lose the mission, entire squad will be discharged.)

=== Evolution 11: Meth Lab ===
Bravo vs. Charlie

Training Exercise: Weapons Assembly (25 Bonus Points toward Mission)

Teams must assemble four weapons one man at a time. First squad to assemble and fire all four weapons wins. Winner: Bravo

Training Exercise: The Grid (50 Bonus Points toward Mission)

First round was a stalemate (Charlie had the upper hand but Steve Claggett from Bravo stubbornly refused to go into the water prompting the decision for a redo). Winner: Bravo

Mission: Meth Lab

A drug cartel has set up a meth lab in the desert. Their leader is Santos Hernandez. This is a reconnaissance mission with teams being the eyes and the ears for headquarters. The objective is to get enough information to get a warrant to arrest Santos Hernandez. They will be given a camera for documentation. Headquarters wants to know if it is a working lab, how many suspects, what type of vehicles, how many weapons and any other useful information. Teams will radio headquarters with their findings and await further instructions.

During the mission, while the teams are sending information to headquarters, they will have to verify if Santos Hernandez is at the meth lab location. Santos Hernandez in fact does make an appearance later on ordering the lab to pack up and leave. When teams have positively identified Santos Hernandez, headquarters ordered the teams to arrest him for questioning. The time will stop once they radio headquarters confirming the arrest. He must be taken alive otherwise teams will be penalized 250 points.

Teams	Into Mission	Dead (50 point penalty)	Mission Objective (250 point penalty)	Time (5 point penalty)	Score	Result
Bravo	1075	-50 (1 dead)	0 (Santos Hernandez arrested)	-135 (27 minutes)	890	WINNERS
Charlie	1000	-100 (2 dead)	-250 (Santos Hernandez escaped)	-125 (25 minutes)	525	Team Discharged

=== Leaderboard after Evolution 11 ===
Teams	Wins	Losses	Strength
Bravo	6	0	6 men
Delta	4	1	6 men
Alpha	1	4	4 men
Charlie	0	6	DISCHARGED

=== Evolution 12: Meth Lab ===
Alpha vs. Delta

Training Exercise: The Gauntlet (50 Bonus Points toward Mission)

Winner: Alpha

Mission: Meth Lab

A drug cartel has set up a meth lab in the desert. Their leader is Santos Hernandez. This is a reconnaissance mission with teams being the eyes and the ears for headquarters. The objective is to get enough information to get a warrant to arrest Santos Hernandez. They will be given a camera for documentation. Headquarters wants to know if it is a working lab, how many suspects, what type of vehicles, how many weapons and any other useful information. Teams will radio headquarters with their findings and await further instructions.

During the mission, while the teams are sending information to headquarters, they will have to verify if Santos Hernandez is at the meth lab location. Santos Hernandez in fact does make an appearance later on ordering the lab to pack up and leave. When teams have positively identified Santos Hernandez, headquarters ordered the teams to arrest him for questioning. The time will stop once they radio headquarters confirming the arrest. He must be taken alive otherwise teams will be penalized 250 points.

Teams	Into Mission	Dead (50 point penalty)	Mission Objective (250 point penalty)	Time (5 point penalty)	Score	Result
Delta	1000	-150 (3 dead)	0 (Santos Hernandez arrested)	-120 (24 minutes)	730	WINNERS
Alpha	1050	-100 (2 dead)	-250 (Santos Hernandez escaped)	-140 (28 minutes)	560	Team Discharged

=== Leaderboard after Evolution 12 ===
Teams	Wins	Losses	Strength
Bravo	6	0	6 men
Delta	5	1	6 men
Alpha	1	5	DISCHARGED
Charlie	0	6	DISCHARGED

=== Evolution 13: Fuel Dump Demolition ===
Bravo vs. Delta

Team Championship Round to determine overall squad winner.

Training Exercise: Helocasting (50 Bonus Points toward Mission)

Teams jump from a helicopter into water and swim to shore. Winner: Bravo

Mission: Fuel Dump Demolition

The objective is to blow up the fuel dump. Teams must reach their Objective Rallying Point (ORP) and call headquarters before blowing up the fuel dump. Shadow squad can be reinforced in a few minutes by armored tank so teams have to move fast. Teams will be equipped with an anti-tank gun. During the mission, teams observed Prisoners of War (POW) being mistreated by Shadow Squad. Headquarters then tell the teams that their primary mission is to rescue all the POWs while their secondary objective is to destroy the fuel dump.

Teams	Into Mission	Dead (50 point penalty)	Mission Objective (100 point penalty)	Time (5 point penalty)	Score	Result
Bravo	1050	0 (0 dead)	0 (Successfully Rescued the POW's)	-95 (19 minutes)	955	WINNERS
Delta	1000	-50 (1 dead)	0 (Successfully Rescued the POW's)	-125 (25 minutes)	825	Team Discharged

=== Leaderboard after Evolution 13 ===
Teams	Wins	Losses	Strength
Bravo	7	0	6 men
Delta	5	2	DISCHARGED
Alpha	1	5	DISCHARGED
Charlie	0	6	DISCHARGED

For winning the Team Championship, each member of Bravo Team wins $25,000.

=== Evolution 14: Urban Assault ===
Bravo squad was split up into two teams (Bravo Red and Bravo Blue). Each player drew a sword and the two players who drew the marked sword became the team captain and selected their team members. Bob Kain leads Bravo Blue and chooses Jeff Byers and Dexter Fletcher. Sean Sirker leads Bravo Red and chooses Mark Corwin and Steve Claggett.

Training Exercise

The first training exercise was a combination of previous Evolutions (Helocasting, log carry, 1 Lap rucksack run, pit-cross and swim across the lake with the rucksack). First team to reach their bunker and sets off the explosive charge wins. The losing team will have to carry an additional 10 pounds in their rucksacks for the final mission. (Rucksack original weight is 50 pounds). Winner: Bravo Blue

Training Exercise: The Grid

The first team to knock all the opposing team members into the water (best 2 out of 3) wins. The losing team will have to carry an additional 10 pounds in their rucksack for the final mission which means that the team that lost the previous training exercise (Bravo Red) would have to carry an additional 20 pounds for the final mission if they lose. Winner: Bravo Red

Mission

For the mission, both squads begin at opposite ends of a neighborhood that contain one story houses. They will be given a map to guide them to a house where they will find a supply of ammunition and another map to another house. The goal is to move at least one of their men to 5 houses and the map in the 5th house will direct them to their final objective. First team to pop smoke at the final location wins. The losing team will be discharged. There are no penalty points for time elapsed or team members killed although both teams will wear the MILES laser system and can be killed by the other team.

Teams	Team Members	Result
Bravo Blue	Bob Kain, Jeff Byers, Dexter Fletcher	WINNERS
Bravo Red	Sean Sirker, Mark Corwin, Steve Claggett	Discharged

=== Evolution 15: Best of the Best Combat Missions Championship ===
Bravo Blue was split into individuals and competed head to head separated by color.

Jeff Byers: Yellow

Bob Kain: Blue

Dexter Fletcher: Red

Training Exercise: Obstacle Course

The first training exercise is a race through an obstacle course with the winner wearing a 30-pound rucksack for the next mission, second place wears a 40-pound rucksack and third place wears a 50-pound rucksack.

1st Place: Jeff Byers

2nd Place: Dexter Fletcher

3rd Place: Bob Kain

Mission: Desert Assault

A 600-meter race with colored targets to shoot at along the way. Each player must shoot all targets matching their color and get to the helicopter at the finish line. Last person to finish will be discharged.

Jeff Byers had issues with his weapon as it was constantly jamming which ultimately led to his discharge. Rudy consoled him at the discharge ceremony and wouldn't have minded seeing a fellow SEAL win the competition.

Player	Place	Result
Bob Kain	1st Place	WINNER
Dexter Fletcher	2nd Place	ADVANCE
Jeff Byers	3rd Place	Discharged

Final Mission: Last Man Standing

Players will wear a face shield with a target on it. They will start at opposite sides of a maze filled with glass panels. As time goes on, the glass panels will shatter leaving both players more vulnerable to getting hit. The first person to make a clean hit on the Target of their opponent's shield will be crowned Combat Missions Champion.

Player	Result
Dexter Fletcher	CHAMPION
Bob Kain	RUNNER-UP

== Contestants on Other Competition Shows ==
- John Winn previously competed on American Gladiators, where he was the winner of the Armed Forces Challenge of Champions special in season six.
- Cade Courtley would later appear on a 2017 episode of Shark Tank, where he pitched his product Victory Coffee. He was rejected by all five panelists.
- Scott Helvenston appeared on the controversial competition show Man vs. Beast, where he defeated a chimpanzee in an obstacle course challenge.
