= Tough Love season 1 =

Tough Love
- Season 1
- Starring: Steven Ward; JoAnn Ward
- No. of episodes: 8

Release
- Original network: VH1
- Original release: March 15 – May 3, 2009

Season chronology
- Next → Season 2

Tough Love (season 1) is the first season of the American reality television series Tough Love, which first aired on VH1. The show features eight women seeking relationship advice from the host and matchmaker, Steven Ward, and his mother JoAnn Ward, both of the Philadelphia-based Master Matchmakers.

== Contestants ==
Name	Age	Title
Abiola Abrams	32	Miss Picky
Jody Green	39	Miss Lone Ranger
Stasha Kravljanac	33	Miss Ball Buster
Natasha Malinsky	28	Mis-Guided
Arian Mayer	27	Miss Party Girl
Taylor Royce	26	Miss Gold digger
Jessa Faye Settles	24	Miss Fatal Attraction
Jacklyn Watkins	22	Miss BrideZilla

== Episode Progress ==
Contestants	Episodes							
Contestants	1	2	3	4	5	6	7	8
Abiola	BEST	HIGH	LOW	AVG	LOW	WORST	AVG	GOOD
Jacklyn	WORST	AVG	HIGH	HIGH	HIGH	HIGH	BEST	GOOD
Jessa	HIGH	BEST	HIGH	AVG	AVG	AVG	AVG	GOOD
Jody	LOW	WORST	BEST	HIGH	BEST	HIGH	AVG	GOOD
Natasha	LOW	AVG	AVG	AVG	HIGH	AVG	LOW	GOOD
Taylor	^{H}		WORST	BEST	WORST	BEST	AVG	LEFT
Arian	HIGH	HIGH	LOW	WORST	LOW	AVG	OUT	
Stasha	AVG	LOW	AVG	AVG	LEFT			

^{H} Taylor's performance wasn't reviewed because she became ill and was taken to the hospital before group therapy in Episode 1 and returned after the challenge in Episode 2.
Note: In episode 7, there was no hot seat, but Steve dismissed Arian from the house because he felt she wasn't learning anything from him or boot camp.

The contestant had the best progress/date of the week
The contestant was commended for good progress/date
The contestant had average progress/date
The contestant had poor progress/date
The contestant had the worst progress/date of the week
The contestant left the show
The contestant was asked to leave because Steve didn't think Boot Camp could help her.
The contestant had good progress and was in the hot seat.

== Episodes ==
=== What Men Really Think ===
First aired March 15, 2009

Eight women, struggling to find love, arrive at the VH1 Tough Love Boot camp to enlist the aide of mother and son Master Matchmakers, JoAnn and Steven Ward. First impressions are everything, and Steven wastes no time preparing the girls for love as he puts them through their first grueling exercise -- learning what men really think of them based on their appearance alone. The feedback isn't pretty, but it's the truth, and after only one day at Boot Camp, one of the girls is sent to the hospital.

— VH1 Episode Summary

- Challenge: First Impressions
- Challenge Winner: Abiola
- Weakest Participant: Jacklyn

=== Red Flags and White Lies ===
First aired March 22, 2009

Too much information can scare away potential men, so Steve takes the girls to a local gym to work on their physical fitness and test their ability to keep a secret. Later, Steve sends the girls on some shocking dates, literally, as he outfits them with "The Zapper" - a small electronic devices that zaps them with whenever they revert to their old, bad dating habits. Abiola makes a connection on her dream date with Terrence, and Taylor returns from the hospital, to the dismay of the rest of the girls who have gotten used to life at Boot Camp without her.

— VH1 Episode Summary

- Challenge: Zapper Dating
- Challenge Winner: Jessa
- Weakest Participant: Jody

=== Sex and the Male Brain ===
First aired March 29, 2009

The girls get a chance to show Steve what they think is sexy when they step in front of the camera for a photo shoot. Later they attend a racy lingerie party where Arian gets hands-on with a man she just met, Jody and Jacklyn continue their budding relationships with Shane and Brock, and Taylor offends her date with talk about money after drinking one too many.

— VH1 Episode Summary

- Challenge: Sexy Photoshoot & Lingerie Party
- Challenge Winner: Jody
- Weakest Participant: Taylor

=== Friends Don't Let Friends Date Bitches ===
First aired April 5, 2009

Steve teaches the girls that when you date a guy, you're also dating his inner circle of friends. The ladies compete in touch football and bar trivia to prove they can be one of the guys, but Arian takes the challenge a little too far. Natasha goes on a dream date with a tennis pro, while Jody's relationship with Shane takes a dramatic turn for the worse. Stasha comes to Steve with a shocking revelation.

— VH1 Episode Summary

- Challenge: Bar Trivia
- Challenge Winner: Taylor
- Weakest Participant: Arian

=== Dollars and Sex ===
First aired April 12, 2009

The girls try to strip away the past as they strip away t-shirts revealing embarrassing facts about themselves. Taylor is put to the test when a wealthy man offers her an indecent proposal. Arian invites her date back to the Boot Camp house for an intimate bubble bath, and with Steve and JoAnn's encouragement, Jody agrees to give Shane another chance.

— VH1 Episode Summary

- Challenge: Perception
- Challenge Winner: Jody
- Weakest Participant: Taylor
- Left: Stasha

=== Dirty Little Secrets ===
First aired April 19, 2009

Steve hosts a game show where a male studio audience decides whether or not the girls are "Cute or Crazy." The women are given an assignment to reveal an incredibly personal piece of information about themselves to their dates. Jody, who never dated a man with kids before, meets Shane's ten-year-old son, and Steve hooks Jessa up to a polygraph machine to finally get some answers.

— VH1 Episode Summary

- Challenge: Game Show and Secrets
- Challenge Winner: Taylor
- Weakest Participant: Abiola

=== Return of the Exes ===
First aired April 26, 2009

It's visiting day at Boot Camp and Steve invites special guests for each of the girls. Arian uses her mother's visit as an excuse to get revenge on Steve, and Jacklyn is forced to choose between her ex-boyfriend, Greg, and new beau, Brock in a dramatic showdown. At group therapy, Steve tells one of the girls he can't help her anymore.

— VH1 Episode Summary

- Challenge: Battling past relationships with current
- Challenge Winner: Jacklyn
- Left: Arian

=== Season Finale ===
First aired May 3, 2009

The Tough Love Bootcamp is coming to an end for our six remaining girls, but Steve has one last challenge for them, and this time the training wheels are coming off.

— VH1 Episode Summary

- Left: Taylor

==== After the Finale ====
Stasha took Lux to Serbia to meet her family. They plan to marry later this year.

Taylor moved back to Scottsdale to reconnect with her family. She still talks to Jody every day.

Arian moved to L.A. and found a guy…a bartender she met during Tough Love Boot Camp.

Natasha met a guy right after Boot Camp ended and they are dating exclusively. She says she doesn’t need to fix him.

Abiola and Justin tried the "long distance thing", but it didn’t work out. She’s dating and says she’s not Miss Picky anymore.

Jessa had a breakthrough and found true love…with one of her best guy friends.

Jody and Shane dated for a couple of months after Boot Camp, but broke it off when it didn’t get more serious. She has no hard feelings and is happily dating again.

Greg was waiting for Jacklyn at the airport with a ring. They broke up when he went back to his old ways. As a result, Jacklyn lost Brock.
