= Tough Love: Co-Ed =

- Starring: Steven Ward; Monica Ward
- Country of origin: United States

Production
- Running time: 60 minutes (including commercials)

Original release
- Network: VH1
- Release: August 28 – October 23, 2013

Related
- Tough Love New Orleans

Tough Love: Co-Ed (season 6) is the sixth season of the American reality television series Tough Love, which first aired on VH1. The show features four men and four women seeking relationship advice from the host and matchmaker, Steven Ward, and his sister Monica Ward, both of the Philadelphia-based Master Matchmakers.

== Boot Campers ==
Name	Title
Christopher Guerrini	Mr. Peter Pan
Judy Nash	Miss Shut Down
Kris Cottrell	Mr. Me, Myself, and I
Kyle Keller	Miss Disconnected
Paj Mohager	Mr. Superficial
Porsche Abraham	Miss High Maintenance
Sariya Jones	Miss Cursed
Stu Jacobson	Mr. Player

== External sources ==
- MasterMatchmakers.com
