= Helvenston =

Helvenston could refer to:

- Scott Helvenston (1965–2004), American soldier
- Helvenston v. Blackwater Security, 2011 lawsuit
- Helvenston Street Southeast, part of County Road 10A, located in Suwannee County, Florida, U.S.
