= Wilder Weir =

Wilder Weir (born September 23, 1983) is a Canadian television host.

Weir was born in Montreal and is the first of two children born to retired professional ice hockey player Wally Weir.

Weir earned a Bachelor of Arts degree, with a major in film from Queen's University at Kingston playing Division 1 hockey and moonlighting as a CFRC-FM sports commentator in his spare time.

Weir is best known as the co-host of Cosmopolitan TV's Oh So Cosmo. He was first featured on CBC Television's Making the Cut: Last Man Standing in 2004. In 2005 he joined The Sports Network's TSN SportsCentre as writer and story editor. He participated in the dating show Come Date with Me on W Network.
