= Hoffman device =

The term Hoffman device may refer to:

- The Hoffman external lengthening fixator, a prosthetic limb device
- The Hoffman tank gunfire simulator, a tank gunfire simulator.
