= Tough Love Miami =

- Starring: Steven Ward; JoAnn Ward
- Country of origin: United States
- No. of episodes: 10

Production
- Running time: 60 minutes (including commercials)

Original release
- Network: VH1
- Release: October 2 – December 4, 2011

Related
- Tough Love Couples; Tough Love New Orleans

Tough Love: Miami (season 4) is the fourth season of the American reality television series Tough Love, which first aired on VH1. The show features eight women seeking relationship advice from the host and matchmaker, Steven Ward, and his mother JoAnn Ward, both of the Philadelphia-based Master Matchmakers. This season, Tough Love takes place in Miami Beach, Florida.

== Boot Campers ==
| Name | Age | Title |
|---|---|---|
| Avonte Wright | 36 | Miss Other Woman |
| Brigette Wartel | 31 | Miss Desperate |
| Chasity Soules | 25 | Miss Double Standard |
| Christine Streets | 30 | Miss Body Issues |
| Claudia Lopez | 35 | Miss Drama Queen |
| Jane Castro | 29 | Miss Bossy |
| Leilani Dowding | 31 | Miss Superficial |
| Michelle Betts | 33 | Miss Delusional |

== Episode Progress ==
| Contestants | Episodes | | | | | | | | | |
| Contestants | 1 | 2 | 3 | 4 | 5 | 6 | 7 | 8 | 9 | 10 |
|---|---|---|---|---|---|---|---|---|---|---|
| Avonte | AVG | WORST | AVG | BEST | AVG | AVG | AVG | AVG | AVG | GOOD |
| Brigette | AVG | BEST | WORST | AVG | WORST | BEST | AVG | AVG | BEST | GOOD |
| Chasity | AVG | AVG | AVG | AVG | AVG | AVG | WORST | AVG | AVG | GOOD |
| Christine | AVG | AVG | POOR | AVG | BEST | WORST | AVG | AVG | WORST | GOOD |
| Jane | AVG | AVG | BEST | AVG | AVG | AVG | BEST | WORST | WORST | GOOD |
| Leilani | POOR | AVG | AVG | WORST | AVG | AVG | AVG | BEST | AVG | GOOD |
| Michelle | AVG | AVG | AVG | AVG | AVG | AVG | AVG | AVG | WORST | GOOD |
| Claudia | WORST | AVG | AVG | AVG | AVG | AVG | LEFT | | | |

The contestant had the best progress/date of the week
The contestant was commended for good progress/date
The contestant had average progress/date
The contestant had poor progress/date
The contestant had the worst progress/date of the week and was in the hot seat.
The contestant left boot camp.
The contestant had good progress and was in the hot seat.

== External sources ==
- MasterMatchmakers.com
