= Ahmad Hashim Abd al-Isawi =

Al Qaeda member executed by hanging

- Died: November 2013
- Allegiance: al-Qaeda
- Penalty: Execution by hanging

Details
- Span of crimes: early 2000s –
- Country: Iraq
- Killed: 4

Ahmad Hashim Abd al-Isawi (Arabic: أحمد هاشم عبد العيساوي) was an al-Qaeda jihadist operating in Iraq in the early 2000s. He allegedly masterminded the ambush and killing of four American military contractors whose bodies were then dragged by a spontaneously formed mob and hung from the old bridge over the Euphrates river in Fallujah, Iraq. In September 2009, a team of U.S. Navy SEALs captured al-Isawi in a nighttime raid in Fallujah, and he was charged with orchestrating the slayings. He was held for a time by the United States intelligence community and accused some of the SEALs who captured him of mistreating him while detained at Camp Schwedler. al-Isawi was subsequently handed over to Iraqi authorities and was awaiting his trial when he testified at one of the resulting 2010 courts-martial. His trial was held some time before November 2013, and al-Isawi was executed by hanging for the killings.

== Alleged role in 2004 Fallujah ambush ==
On March 31, 2004, Iraqi insurgents ambushed a convoy assigned to protect food caterers ESS who were supplying US military bases near Fallujah. Four armed private contractors working as security guards for Blackwater USA – Scott Helvenston, Jerry Zovko, Wesley Batalona, and Michael Teague – were killed by machine gun fire and a grenade thrown through a window of their SUVs. Their bodies were dragged from the burning wreckage of their vehicles, mutilated, and dragged through the streets by a spontaneous mob largely composed of teenagers and boys. Two of the bodies were hung on display from a bridge over the Euphrates river as the crowd celebrated below. Images of the gruesome aftermath were filmed by the international news media, drawing attention to issues around private contractors and prompting Operation Vigilant Resolve, which evolved into the first Battle of Fallujah. Their bodies were recovered near the outskirts of Baghdad early in April.

Abu Musab al-Zarqawi was originally suspected as the organiser of the ambush as he was known to planning terror attacks and believed to be in the area. The intelligence community was doubtful, however, because the exhibitionism of broadcasting images of the desecration of the victim's bodies was uncharacteristic of al-Zarqawi, whose typical style was to leak to Al Jazeera that he had planned an attack some weeks after it occurred. Based on intelligence reports, U.S. authorities eventually accused Ahmad Hashim Abd al-Isawi of masterminding the ambush, and he was charged with the deaths upon his capture. The brutality of the ambush and desecration of the victim's remains earned al-Isawi the nickname the "Butcher of Fallujah." The Blackwater killings marked the start of Ahmad Hashim's supposed rivalry with al-Zarqawi and his "blood-soaked journey to the peak of al-Qaeda command." Patrick Robinson's book about al-Isawi's capture described him as having "personally started on the rubble-strewn streets the worst close-combat fighting of the entire war," creating in Fallujah the "most violent area in all of Iraq ... [where] the demented Sunni killer Al-Isawi had assumed a loose and terrifying control."

In September 2004, al-Zarqawi was the "highest priority" target in Fallujah for the United States military; he died in a targeted killing in June 2006 when a United States Air Force jet dropped two 500-pound (230 kg) guided bombs on the safehouse in which he was attending a meeting. al-Isawi replaced him as a key target.

== Capture ==
Five years after the ambush, in September 2009, a Navy SEAL team raided a house in search of al-Isawi. Special Warfare Operator, Second Class Matthew McCabe located and confronted a man matching al-Isawi's description, who was reaching for a gun. Following orders to capture al-Isawi if possible, McCabe subdued al-Isawi and he was taken into custody in what was initially reported as a "textbook" operation.

=== Abuse allegations ===
Following his incarceration at Camp Schwedler, al-Isawi alleged, with blood on his lip and shirt, that he had suffered abuse as a detainee. According to U.S. authorities, a jihadist manual discovered in 2000 instructs captured operatives to immediately claim to have been mistreated. Petty officer third class MA3 Kevin DeMartino who had responsibility for supervising al-Isawi, and had left him unsupervised in violation of procedures, offered corroboration that McCabe had struck al-Isawi in the stomach while other SEALs failed to intervene. Members of the SEAL team were interrogated and encouraged to confess to misdeeds in return for receiving non-judicial punishment, which they refused and exercised their right to demand to face a court-martial. McCabe, Jonathan Keefe, and Julio Huertas ultimately faced courts-martial on charges including assault (McCabe only), making a false official statement, and dereliction of performance of duty for willfully failing to safeguard a detainee.

=== Courts-martial ===
SEAL Team members offered testimony on the character of the SEALs and what they had witnessed. This included Carl Higbie, who participated in the capture of al-Isawi and has written two books about the raid and its aftermath. In the United States, dozens of Republican lawmakers wrote to Secretary of Defense Robert Gates, President Barack Obama, and Chairman of the Joint Chiefs of Staff Admiral Michael Mullen seeking their intervention. Claims were made of unlawful command influence, alleging that Major General Charles Cleveland had been inappropriately influenced as the convening authority to proceed to court-martial rather than to dismiss the trial. These were dismissed at the McCabe court-martial, but the belief that decisions were driven by the shadow of Abu Ghraib persists in some quarters.

al-Isawi's recorded testimony was played, in which he alleged that "while handcuffed and blindfolded, he was kicked in the abdomen and fell to the floor ... [and] then kicked several more times while on the floor." The defence presented what it described as inconsistencies in al-Isawi's testimony. Evidence was then submitted of al-Isawi's suspected involvement in the Fallujah killings, and testimony presented that he was "believed to have killed hundreds of Iraqis" and earned the nickname "The Finisher" amongst Iraqis, for his reputedly having "the decapitated bodies of his victims delivered to their families' doorsteps." The defense and some subsequent commentary argued that al-Isawi was following the directions in the al-Qaeda manual to claim mistreatment. Following his capture, al-Isawi was to be handed over to Iraqi authorities but they were unable to accept custody until the following morning, forcing his detention in Camp Schwedler, which lacked a proper detention facility. DeMartino took responsibility for al-Isawi despite the second master-at-arms having been transferred back to the United States, and admitted that he was consequently in dereliction of duty both in accepting the prisoner and in leaving him unattended.

All three men were acquitted, with the Keefe and Huerta courts-martial taking place in Iraq to allow al-Isawi to testify in person. Commentary in American conservative media criticized the Navy for its handling of the abuse allegations. The acquittals were met with anger in Iraq, with the head of the Iraqi human rights group Hammurabi describing the courts-martial as "just propaganda for [American] justice and democracy"; another Iraqi was quoted as having responded to the verdict in the Huertas court-martial by saying that "[t]hey would release him even if he had killed an Iraqi and not just beaten him."

== Death ==
al-Isawi was in Iraqi custody at the time he testified in the Huertas and Keefe courts-martial in April 2010. He was asked directly about his responsibility for the massacre and ambush in Fallujah in 2004, and responded that "I have nothing to do with this." His own trial on charges of orchestrating the killings was pending at the time of this testimony. al-Isawi was executed by hanging at some point prior to November 2013.
