= Tough Love New Orleans =

- Starring: Steven Ward; JoAnn Ward
- Country of origin: United States
- No. of episodes: 10

Production
- Running time: 60 minutes (including commercials)

Original release
- Network: VH1
- Release: April 15 – June 24, 2012

Related
- Tough Love Miami; Tough Love: Co-Ed

Tough Love: New Orleans (season 5) is the fifth season of the American reality television series Tough Love, which first aired on VH1. The show features eight women seeking relationship advice from the host and matchmaker, Steven Ward, and his mother JoAnn Ward, both of the Philadelphia-based Master Matchmakers. This season, Tough Love takes place in New Orleans, Louisiana.

== Boot Campers ==
Name	Age	Title
Danielle Wilks	27	Miss Low Standards
Despina Delios	28	Miss Man Eater
Donna Sonkin	40	Miss Ticking Clock
Elizabeth Vashisht	32	Miss Gold Digger
Melissa Schultz	25	Miss Awkward
Shalana August	25	Miss Bitter
Stephanie Stasiak	27	Miss Husband Hungry
Tiffany Maiyon	31	Miss Phony

== Episode Progress ==
Contestants	Episodes									
Contestants	1	2	3	4	5	6	7	8	9	10
Despina	AVG	AVG	AVG	POOR	AVG	AVG	AVG	AVG	AVG	GOOD
Donna	AVG	WORST	AVG	AVG	POOR	BEST	AVG	AVG	AVG	GOOD
Elizabeth	BEST	AVG	AVG	AVG	WORST	AVG	BEST	WORST	AVG	GOOD
Melissa	AVG	POOR	AVG	POOR	POOR	POOR	WORST	BEST	AVG	GOOD
Shalana	AVG	POOR	AVG	BEST	AVG	AVG	AVG	AVG	AVG	GOOD
Stephanie	AVG	BEST	AVG	GOOD	GOOD	WORST	AVG	AVG	AVG	GOOD
Danielle	AVG	AVG	WORST	AVG	AVG	AVG	AVG	AVG	AVG	LEFT
Tiffany	WORST	AVG	BEST	OUT						

- In Episode 1, Steve revealed to the girls that this season, there is a "three strikes" rule. If the woman is in the hot seat three times, she must leave.

The contestant had the best progress/date of the week
The contestant was commended for good progress/date
The contestant had average progress/date
The contestant had poor progress/date
The contestant had the worst progress/date of the week and was in the hot seat.
The contestant voluntarily left the show.
The contestant was ejected from boot camp after it was learned she was married and the mother of three children.
The contestant had good progress and was in the hot seat.

== External sources ==
- MasterMatchmakers.com
