= Tough Love Couples =

- Cast
- Starring: Steven Ward; JoAnn Ward
- Country of origin: United States
- No. of episodes: 8

Production
- Running time: 60 minutes (including commercials)

Original release
- Network: VH1
- Release: April 12 – May 31, 2010

Related
- Season Two; Tough Love Miami

Tough Love Couples is the third season of the American reality television series Tough Love, which first aired on VH1. The show features six couples seeking relationship advice from the host and matchmaker, Steven Ward, and his mother JoAnn Ward, both of the Philadelphia-based Master Matchmakers.

== Contestants ==
Name	Title
Pawel and Danielle	The Role Reversals
Dennis and Simone	The Now or Nevers
Ryan and Axelle	The Drama-ramas
Larry and Heather	The Second Chances
Dustin and Courtney	The High-school Sweethearts
Mario and Christina	The Mistrustfuls

== Episode Progress ==
Contestants	Episodes							
Contestants	1	2	3	4	5	6	7	8
Pawel and Danielle								
Dennis and Simone								
Larry and Heather								
Dustin and Courtney								
Mario and Christina								
Ryan and Axelle								

The couple had the best progress.
The couple was commended for good progress.
The couple had average progress.
The couple had poor progress.
The couple had the worst progress.
The couple had the worst progress and was broken up by Steve.
The couple had good progress and was in the hot seat.
The couple left the show and broke up.

== Episodes ==
=== Episode 1: "Couples Boot Camp Begins" ===
First aired April 12, 2010

- Challenge: Couples were asked to dress in wedding attire if ready to commit.
- Challenge Winner: Dennis and Simone.
- Weakest Couple: Mario and Christina.
- Episode Notes:

=== Episode 2: "Fighting Dirty" ===
First aired April 19, 2010

- Challenge: Communication
- Challenge Winner: No One
- Weakest Couple: Larry and Heather

=== Episode 3: "What Happens At Boot Camp..." ===
First aired April 26, 2010

- Challenge: Couples were sent to a sex shop to pick out adventurous new toys for each other.
- Challenge Winner: Mario and Christina showed the most progress.
- Weakest Couple: Dustin and Courtney were not only put on the hot seat, they were told to split up for the remainder of the show.
- Episode Notes: Dustin and Courtney will now be participating as single people and may be set up on dates.

=== Episode 4: "Temptation, Temptation" ===
First aired May 3, 2010

- Challenge: Boundaries
- Challenge Winner: Ryan and Axelle
- Weakest Couple: Mario and Christina

=== Episode 5: "The Interrogation" ===
First aired May 10, 2010

- Challenge: Couples focused on communicating sensitive information to their partners.
- Challenge Winner: Mario and Christina
- Weakest Couple: Ryan and Axelle
- Episode Note: Ryan and Axelle broke up and they left the show.

=== Episode 6: "Exes is a Four Letter Word" ===
First aired May 17, 2010

- Challenge: The couples are shaken when their ex-boyfriends and ex-girlfriends arrive at Boot Camp
- Challenge Winner: No One
- Weakest Couples: Dennis and Simone and Larry and Heather

=== Episode 7: "The Ring's The Thing" ===
First aired May 17, 2010

- Challenge: Couples are focused on getting serious about their possible engagements.
- Challenge Winner: Dennis and Simone
- Weakest Couple: Pawel and Danielle

=== Episode 8: "It's Now Or Never" ===
First aired May 24, 2010
