= 2004 Fallujah ambush =

Attack on a US private military company convoy during the Iraq War

- Part of the Iraq War
- Type: Ambush
- Location: Fallujah, Iraq
- Target: Blackwater USA personnel
- Date: March 31, 2004
- Executed by: Joint operation between Al-Qaeda in Iraq and the Islamic Army in Iraq
- Casualties: 4 killed

The 2004 Fallujah ambush occurred on March 31, 2004, when Iraqi insurgents attacked a convoy containing four American contractors from the private military company Blackwater USA who were conducting a delivery for food caterers ESS.

The contractors were killed, and their charred corpses were hung from a bridge over the Euphrates. Photographs of the event circulated widely.

== The ambush ==
The four contractors — Scott Helvenston, Jerry Zovko, Wesley Batalona and Mike Teague — were killed and dragged from their vehicles. Their bodies were beaten, burned, dragged through the city streets, and hung from a Euphrates River bridge.

== Response ==
Photos of the event, showing jubilant Iraqis posing with the charred corpses, were released to news agencies worldwide. It caused a great deal of indignation in the United States and undermined the media narrative that US involvement in Iraq was a short-term operation welcomed by the civilian population.

The ambush led to the First Battle of Fallujah, a U.S.-led operation to retake control of the city. The operation failed and U.S. forces withdrew after nearly four weeks. Seven months later, in November 2004, a second mission to capture the city, the Second Battle of Fallujah, proved successful.

Intelligence reports concluded that the attack was planned by Ahmad Hashim Abd al-Isawi. He was captured by Navy SEALs in 2009, five years later. al-Isawi was held for a time by the United States intelligence community, including at Camp Schwedler. In 2010, he testified at a court-martial of SEALs he accused of mistreating him. He was subsequently handed over to Iraqi authorities for trial and executed by hanging some time before November 2013.

== 2005 lawsuit ==
The families of the victims filed suit (Helvenston et al. v. Blackwater Security) against Blackwater USA for wrongful death in January 2005.
