= Smart onboard data interface module =

Live weapons training simulator

The Smart Onboard Data Interface Module (SMODIM) is an integrated device once used by the United States Army and foreign militaries for live simulated weapons training on military platforms. The SMODIM was the primary component of the Longbow Apache Tactical Engagement Simulation System (LBA TESS) that provides weapons systems training and collective Force-on-Force live training participation.

TESS was an advanced weapons training system developed for the AH-64 Apache to support force-on-force and force-on-target live training at U.S. Army Combat Training Centers (CTCs), Aviation Home Stations, and deployed locations. TESS integrates with aircraft and ground vehicles to provide collective opposing force participation in live training.

The Aerial Weapons Scoring System (AWSS) integration with LBA TESS provided the ability to conduct force-on-target engagements using plastic ammunition for 30 mm gun, rockets, and simulated virtual emulated Hellfire missiles. Gunnery scoring was supported by the SMODIM, which transmitted data from the one point to the other. AWSS scored the pilot's live-fire gunnery performance and provided constructive After Action Review (AAR) feedback.

Designed and manufactured by Aerotech,"The SMODIM was fully compatible with the multiple integrated laser engagement system (MILES) and legacy laser-based direct fire weapons simulation. Additionally, it eliminates the requirement for MILES-type lasers by providing the capability to geometrically pair weapon engagements with lasers".

SMODIM

== Background ==
In 1992, Aerotech was selected by U.S. Army Communications Electronics Command (CECOM) to provide the real-time casualty assessment (RTCA) interface for the AH-64 Apache Attack Helicopter. This component was called the onboard data interface module (ODIM). As the Army incorporated new technologies, the SMODIM added GPS and telemetry and became the core component of live helicopter training systems at all U.S. Army Combat Training Centers (CTCs) with a fielding of over 240 systems. In 1997, the SMODIM was modified to provide a proof of concept for the upgraded AH-64 (D model) Longbow Apache. In 1998 the "Modular" SMODIM and the longbow tactical engagement simulation system (TESS) training system was fielded to all three CTCs and Aviation Home Stations, and became the U.S. Army's first fully integrated live aviation training system. Over the following 15 years, the SMODIM has deployed in multiple systems and platforms with over one thousand SMODIMs fielded in the U.S. and abroad. An "Advanced" SMODIM or "ASMODIM" is currently in development due to parts obsolescence and will provide an 80% increased processing performance. Security encryption is in accordance with FIPS 140-2 level 2. Advanced weapon simulation is augmented by digital terrain elevation data (DTED) and geometric ranging. Data communication and data transmission upgrades utilize RS-422 and RS-485 full duplex channels, and ARINC 429 technical standards.

== Overview ==
The SMODIM includes a built-in GPS receiver, telemetry radio, data recorder, and MIL-STD-1553 mux bus processors. The SMODIM interfaces with the weapons systems and actively tracks, records and transmits data to the ground station or exercise control (EXCON). RTCA feedback is passed directly to the weapons processor and the ground station through the onboard telemetry radio. The SMODIM processes area weapons effects (AWE) data received from the EXCON and computes geometric pairing solutions for weapon engagements using the RF Hellfire, semi-automated laser (SAL) Hellfire, 30 mm chain gun, and rockets. It selects a target from its onboard player/position database in the appropriate weapons impact footprint, then uses the probability-of-hit (Ph) factor to determine the assessment (i.e., 'hit'/'miss'). Via the data link, it then informs the target it has been selected for assessment.

The SMODIM maintains a dynamic position database through player-to-player network communications. The onboard telemetry radio supports simultaneous distribution to multiple locations. The radio acts as a message repeater to overcome line of sight (LOS) interruptions. The SMODIM interfaces with distributed interactive simulation (DIS) networks using SMODIM tracking analysis and recording (SMOTAR), an advanced software suite that provides visual display and tracking of SMODIM instrumented players. GPS provides real-time position data as players are dynamically simulated, tracked and recorded over tactical maps and aerial photos for after-action review (AAR).

The TESS Aircraft System consists of an "A" kit that becomes part of the aircraft, and a "B" kit that is added to the aircraft for training exercises. The "A" kit includes the SMODIM Tray Assembly, modified software in the weapons display and systems processors, with cable connection provisions. The "B" kit includes the SMODIM, Eye-Safe Laser Range Finder/Designator (ESLRF/D), TESS Gun Control Unit (TGCU), Aircraft Internal Boresight Subassembly (AIBS), TESS Training Missile (TTM) with Flash Weapon Effects Signature Simulator (FlashWESS), GPS and telemetry antennas.

SMODIM installed in Apache Helicopter

SMODIM installed in Apache Block III helicopter (top right shelf)

SMODIM showing interface connections

=== Monitored parameters ===
- Aircraft Position Location and Heading
- Aircraft Pitch, Roll and Yaw
- Ammunition Inventories
- Aircraft Survivability Equipment (ASE) Status (on/off)
- Missile, Rocket and Gun Firing
- Player ID
- Radar Altitude
- Range to Target
- Real Time Casualty Assessment
- Weapon Release
- Selected Sight
- Selected Designator Laser Code and Missile Seeker Code
- Target Acquisition Designation Sight (TADS) Azimuth
- Target Position

=== Qualifications ===
The SMODIM is qualified with an airworthiness release (AWR) through the Aviation Engineering Directorate (AED). Environmental and Electromagnetic Interference (EMI) compliance tests include DO-160, MIL-STD-810E/F and ADS-37A-PRF.

=== Platforms ===
The SMODIM is used on the following platforms with applicable current contract information:

- AH-64 Apache Longbow Attack Helicopter; FMS Royal Netherlands Air Force Longbow TESS
- WAH-64 AgustaWestland Apache Helicopter; FMS United Kingdom (UK) Collective Training System
- CH-47 Chinook Helicopter; AV TESS Supplemental Kits
- UH-60 Blackhawk Helicopter; AV TESS Supplemental Kits
- OH-58 Kiowa Warrior Helicopter; KW CASUP TESS
- UH-72A Light Utility Helicopter; Offensive Capability

Other platforms instrumented with the SMODIM include:

- LYNX Attack Helicopter
- Aircraft Survivability Equipment Trainer (ASET) IV
- Avenger Air Defense
- M270, M270A1 M270 Multiple Launch Rocket System (MLRS)

== U.S. army programs ==
The TESS training system and SMODIM are used by the U.S. Army at Aviation Homestations and CTCs (NTC, JRTC, JMRC). Permanent TESS training support is provided at Ft Hood, TX since 1998 for the 21st Cavalry Brigade, and is ongoing through the 166th Aviation Brigade and Foreign Military customers that train there. Permanent field support for TESS is also provided at the CTCs.

The UH-72A LUH Lakota is recently instrumented with the SMODIM and will deploy to Germany at the Joint Multinational Command Training Center (JMTC) to train pilots in combat engagements. TESS provides the capability to track all LUH aircraft and provide OPFOR aircraft status (alive or killed) to the CTC EXCON. Simulated weapons capability allows Force-on-Force and Force-on-Target training engagements.

The SMODIM supports U.S. Army Homestation gunnery on digital range training system (DRTS), Digital Air Ground Integration Range (DAGIR), and Aviation Homestation Interim Package (AHIP) ranges. Upon proven success, the SMODIM has become a key component of the Tank-Automotive and Armaments Command (TACOM) AHIP modular After Action Review capability. Beginning in September 2013, five AHIP AAR systems that use SMOTAR software suite are being fielded to Ft Knox, KY, Ft Drum, NY, Ft Stewart, GA, Ft Hood, TX, and Grafenwoehr Germany. The objective solution is full integration of ground/air manned platforms and Unmanned Aircraft Systems (UAS) including Gray Eagle, Shadow, Raven, and Puma.

These programs are contracted by the U.S. Army Training and Doctrine Command (TRADOC), Program Executive Office for Simulation, Training and Instrumentation (PEO STRI), and Program Manager Training Devices (PM TRADE).

== FMS & direct sales ==
Direct and foreign military sales (FMS) of the aviation TESS are currently in use by: Netherlands, Taiwan, Kuwait, Egypt, United Kingdom, Singapore, and United Arab Emirates.
