= Oh So Cosmo =

- Starring: Josie Dye; Wilder Weir; Jacqui Skeete (journalist)
- Theme music composer: Senor Kasio
- Country of origin: Canada
- Original language: English
- No. of seasons: 3
- No. of episodes: 83

Production
- Running time: 22:30 minutes

Original release
- Network: Cosmopolitan TV
- Release: 2008 – present

Oh So Cosmo is a half-hour magazine-style television show aired on Cosmopolitan TV. It offers stories and segments about the lifestyle of hip, urban women, and focus on men, sex, relationships and style.

Hosted by Josie Dye and Wilder Weir and featuring reports by Jacqui Skeete, Oh So Cosmo explores subjects related to men, sex and relationships as well as provide the latest news on style and trends. All aspects of being single and relationships are covered from eligible bachelors to sex and relationship tips.

Episodes of Oh So Cosmo feature segments on how to meet, seduce and understand men and examines the latest style, beauty and exercise trends. In essence, the show is a video version of Cosmopolitan magazine.

The show airs on Cosmopolitan TV and on Cosmopolitan’s YouTube Channel.

== Personalities ==
- Josie Dye – Host
- Wilder Weir – Co-Host
- Jacqui Skeete – Reporter
