= Josie Dye =

Canadian broadcaster

Joscelyne "Josie" Dye is a Canadian radio and television personality, currently co-host with Nat Hunter of the morning show on CHUM-FM in Toronto, Ontario.

Prior to joining the station, she was a personality on CFNY-FM (102.1 The Edge), and later the morning host on CIND-FM (Indie88), in the same market, and worked in television at Corus Entertainment for both W and CMT Canada.

Her first professional role was Amaryllis in Limelight Theater's production of The Music Man at age 9 and she played an orphan at Young People’s Theatre in Jacob Two Two.

== Background ==
Raised in Pickering, she attended Ryerson University from 1998 to 2001, graduating from the Radio and Television Arts Program. She was married on July 24, 2010 to Dine Alone Records founder Joel Carriere.

== Career ==
Dye has hosted Oh So Cosmo on Cosmopolitan TV and Hit or Miss on CMT Canada.

Dye has also hosted the Cutting Edge Music Festival, Wakestock, Edgefest, and the CASBY Awards. She has been involved with the Easter Seals charity since 2002, hosting and attending many of their events.

Dye is a public speaker, giving career, motivational and educational speeches to high school and university students as well as to women's groups, Toastmasters International and the workplace.

She transferred from Indie 88 to CHUM FM in 2024, hosting the afternoon show until the retirement of longtime morning host Marilyn Denis from the station in June 2026.
