= Cosmopolitan Television =

Television network

Cosmopolitan Television brand logo, same logo used for all local channel versions

Cosmopolitan Television brand logo, used in Spain

Cosmopolitan Television is a television network brand that targets a young female demographic consisting of acquired scripted television series, films, lifestyle series and more. The network's name is licensed from the Hearst Communications magazine title Cosmopolitan.

== Cosmopolitan Television channels around the world ==
| Channel | Country or region | Launch year | Shutdown year |
| Cosmo (Spanish TV channel) | Spain | March 1, 2000 | |
| Cosmopolitan TV (Latin America) | Latin America | June 24, 2002 | July 1, 2015 |
| Cosmopolitan TV (Canadian TV channel) | Canada | February 14, 2008 | September 30, 2019 |
