= Hoffman tank gunfire simulator =

Military training device imitating a tank gun

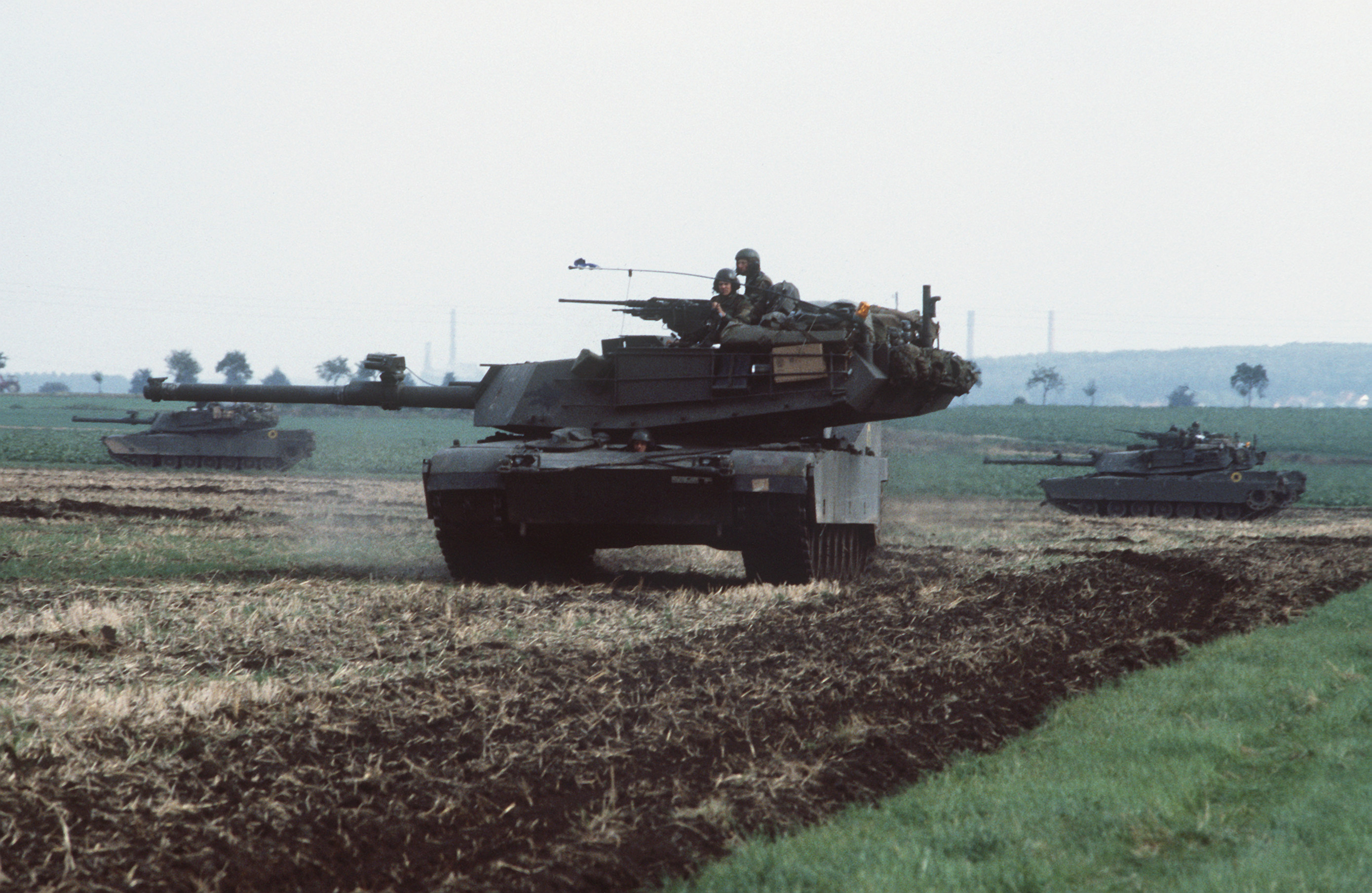
Hoffman device on an M1 Abrams tank in 1985 during Reforger '85 maneuvers in West Germany.

The Hoffman tank gunfire simulator is a pyrotechnic device manufactured by Diehl Defence, used in military training alongside non-gunfire training systems such as MILES. Introduced in the early 1980s, it consists of an array of tubes (usually nine, though the variant for the Leopard 2 has seventeen) resembling a multiple grenade launcher into which explosive cartridges are inserted: these generate a flash, sound and smoke plume designed to imitate the firing of a tank gun.

== Etymology ==
The system is referred to as the "Simulator Tank Gunfire: Main Weapons Effect Signature" in US service, with the cartridges referred to as Simulator, Flash, Artillery M21.

== Description ==
The Hoffman simulator mounts to a bracket which is mounted somewhere near the front of a tank's turret. On the M1 Abrams it is clamped to the bore evacuator, while on recent variants of the Leopard 2 it is mounted on the frontal turret armor. The system is manually loaded and fired electrically, with firing linked to the trigger of the tank's main gun.

== History ==
Over the course of 20 years of service with the US Army, the Hoffman Device acquired a reputation for being prone to accidental discharges: while it is only supposed to fire when triggered electrically, there were numerous cases where static electricity or other local electrical fields resulted in uncommanded firing. A series of internal documents obtained by CBS News in 2003 included statements that "the ammunition is always unsafe" and that many of the devices were "an accident waiting to happen."

In early 2004, modifications were made to Hoffman simulators to prevent uncommanded firing, and a notification was circulated stating that any unmodified devices found in stock should be destroyed.
