= Leilani Dowding =

English media personality and former model (born 1980)

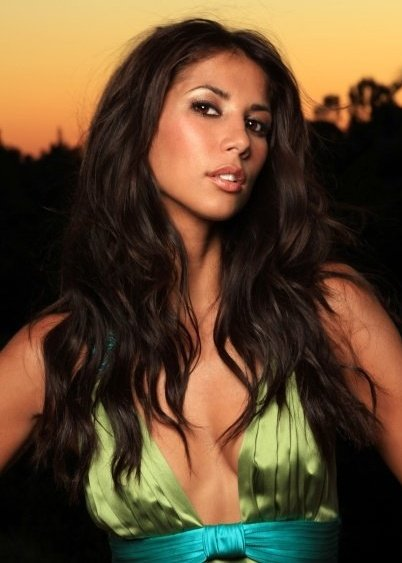
- Born: 30 January 1980 (age 46); Bournemouth, Dorset, England
- Education: Royal Holloway, University of London
- Occupation: Glamour model
- Height: 1.68 m (5 ft 6 in)
- Spouse: Richard Palmer (divorced)
- Beauty pageant titleholder
- Title: Miss Great Britain 1998
- Years active: 1998–present
- Hair colour: Brown
- Eye colour: Brown
- Major competitions: Miss Great Britain 1998 (Winner); Miss Universe 1998 (Unplaced)

Leilani Dowding (born 30 January 1980) is an English former beauty pageant titleholder and former glamour model. After winning Miss Great Britain 1998 and representing the United Kingdom at Miss Universe 1998, she dropped out of college to pursue a career in glamour modelling, appearing as a Page 3 girl in The Sun and featuring in men's magazines such as Maxim and FHM. She later appeared on US and British reality television programmes including Tough Love Miami and The Real Housewives of Cheshire. She has become known as a conservative commentator and anti-mRNA vaccines campaigner. She also contributes to media associated with Mark Steyn.

== Early life ==
Leilani Dowding is multiracial, with a Filipina mother and a British father. She was born on 30 January 1980 in Bournemouth, where she also grew up, and attended St Peter's Catholic School. After attaining eleven GCSEs and three A-levels, she began an economics degree at Royal Holloway, University of London, with the intention of becoming a city trader. At age 18, she entered and won the 1998 Miss Great Britain competition. She represented Britain in the Miss Universe pageant in Hawaii later that year.

== Career ==
Following her success in beauty pageants, Dowding dropped out of university to pursue a full-time modelling career. She started appearing as a Page 3 girl in The Sun in 1999. In 2003, she was rated #89 on the FHM Sexiest Women in The World list. Dowding was featured on Page 3 of the Sun on September 11, 2001, before the feature was placed on an eight-day hiatus following the September 11 attacks.

Dowding has featured as a guest on various television shows, modelling on The Big Breakfast and This Morning, and appearing on Faking It, Celebrity Wrestling and Celebrity Fear Factor. She appeared on a charity Page 3 episode of The Weakest Link, competing on behalf of the RSPCA and breast cancer charities.

She has featured in pantomime, playing Tiger Lilly in Peter Pan. She has competed in celebrity poker tournaments and has done promotional work for Ladbrokes. Her reality television work has included the US show Tough Love Miami and the British programme The Real Housewives of Cheshire. She also established her own clothing line, the Leiluna Collection. Since 2022, she has been a conservative commentator on media hosted by Mark Steyn.

== Personal life ==
Dowding has dated a number of footballers and became known as a "WAG" in the British tabloid press. She was engaged to former Wimbledon and Northern Ireland defender Mark Williams but ended their two-year relationship after he allegedly had an affair with glamour model Linsey Dawn McKenzie. Williams and McKenzie subsequently married. Dowding was also engaged to former Arsenal, West Ham and Middlesbrough attacker Jérémie Aliadière.

During the COVID-19 pandemic, Dowding stated on Twitter that "fat people cause the most strain on the NHS" and blamed them for "making lockdown longer".

She lived in the United States for over a decade, where she was briefly married to American actor and restaurateur Richie Palmer, a former husband of actress Raquel Welch. While living in the US, she began dating Billy Duffy, lead guitarist of British rock band the Cult. She became engaged to Duffy in 2020. The couple moved back to the UK and live in Manchester. She has stated that she wishes to remain childfree.
