= Cade Courtley =

American actor and former US Navy SEAL (born 1969)

- Born: Christopher Courtley; December 30, 1969 (age 56); Columbus, Ohio, United States
- Education: University of San Diego
- Occupation: Television host
- Years active: 2002–2014

Christopher "Cade" Courtley (born December 30, 1969) is a retired American television host and a former Navy SEAL. He was the host of Spike TV's and Discovery Channel's show Surviving Disaster and Sportsman Channel's America Unplugged. He was also the author of a book, entitled SEAL Survival Guide: A Navy SEAL's Secrets to Surviving Any Disaster. He also participated in USA Network's reality competition show, Combat Missions.
