= Man vs. Beast =

2003 reality television special

- Genre: Reality television
- Presented by: Steve Santagati
- Country of origin: United States
- Original language: English

Production
- Executive producers: Eric Schotz; Bill Paolantonio
- Production company: LMNO Entertainment

Original release
- Network: Fox
- Release: January 15, 2003

Man vs. Beast is a series of sensationalistic television specials aired in the United States by the Fox television network in 2003. The shows were produced by Brian Richardson and directed by Bob Levy. They involve a variety of challenges in which people and animals compete against each other. Although the initial special, Man vs. Beast, was panned by critics and animal rights groups, Fox commissioned a sequel, Man vs. Beast 2, which aired on February 20, 2004.

In 2003, ITV commissioned Granada Productions to re-create the American special for British audiences. A six-part series was filmed, hosted by John Fashanu. However, owing to heavy lobbying by animal rights groups, transmission of the series was postponed indefinitely.

== Competitions ==
The competitions included the following matchups:

- Professional eater Takeru Kobayashi lost a hot dog eating contest against a Kodiak bear.
- Scott Helvenston, a US Navy SEAL, won a race against a chimpanzee through an obstacle course.
- A group of 44 dwarfs lost a race against an Asian elephant to see which could pull a McDonnell Douglas DC-10 jet a certain distance first.
- Shawn Crawford, a world-class sprinter, won a 100-metre race against a giraffe but lost against a zebra.
- A Sumo wrestler lost a tug-of-war against a large, female orangutan.
