= Helvenston v. Blackwater Security =

Dismissed lawsuit on wrongful death

Helvenston et al. v. Blackwater Security
- Court: United States District Court for the Eastern District of North Carolina
- Decided: January 25, 2011

Court membership
- Judge sitting: James C. Fox

Keywords
- Breach of contract, public policy, wrongful death

Helvenston et al. v. Blackwater Security was a lawsuit for wrongful death filed in the Eastern District of North Carolina by the families of the four contractors for Blackwater Security (since renamed Academi) killed in the 31 March 2004 Fallujah ambush. The families of the four men, led by Scott Helvenston's mother Katy Helvenston-Wettengel and Donna Zovko, Jerry Zovko's mother, filed suit against Blackwater with lawyer Daniel Callahan on January 5, 2005. Blackwater countersued for $10 million in December 2006, claiming breach of contract provisions that forbade any suit against the company. In January 2011, judge James C. Fox dismissed the suit after no progress was made in court-ordered arbitration.

== Facts and allegations ==
The Blackwater contract with Regency Hotel and Hospitality Company and Eurest Support Services called for at least three men per vehicle on security missions "with a minimum of two armored vehicles to support ESS movements." In addition, the contract called for a minimum of three-man teams in two vehicles (for a total of six men), with a heavily armed rear gunner and time before any mission to review the route and conduct a risk assessment and pre-trip inspection. Blackwater signed a revised contract with Regency on March 12, 2004, that removed the word "armored".

The suit alleges that Blackwater trainer Justin "Shrek" McQuown resented Helvenston and deliberately reassigned Helvenston to the team that was ambushed. The suit further alleges that McQuown intervened and ordered only a four-man team be sent, although six were available, the other two remaining to perform clerical duties. The suit alleges that Blackwater repeatedly made decisions in order to save money that made the deaths of the contractors more likely. These alleged decisions include not buying armored vehicles to save $1.5 million and removing the employee, John Potter, who complained about that action; and violating the contract by not sending out a six-man team with two armored vehicles. Blackwater "countered that the men were betrayed by the Iraqi Civil Defense Corps and targeted in a well-planned ambush" and argued that "the ambush likely would have had the same result even if they had stronger weapons, armored vehicles, maps or even more men."

In December 2006, the families' attorney was sued for $10 million by Blackwater, who argued that the families had breached the security guards' contracts by suing the company for wrongful death.

== Judgment ==
In January 2011, U.S. district judge James C. Fox dismissed the suit after no progress was made in court-ordered arbitration. The plaintiffs announced they would appeal the ruling.

Early in January 2012, the Fourth Circuit Court of Appeals ended the lawsuit with the families of the victims reaching a confidential settlement from the company.

== See also ==
- US contract law
