= Surviving Disaster (TV series) =

2009 American television series

- Created by: Cade Courtley
- Starring: Cade Courtley
- Country of origin: United States
- Original language: English
- No. of seasons: 1
- No. of episodes: 10

Production
- Executive producers: Alex Graham; Jonathan Hewes
- Running time: approx. 43 min

Original release
- Network: SPIKE TV
- Release: September 1 – November 10, 2009

Surviving Disaster is a simulation of real life disaster situations produced by Spike. Hosted by former Navy SEAL Cade Courtley, each episode retells situations in a worst-case scenario and what viewers can do to survive them. There have been ten episodes aired to date. The series was not picked up for a second season.

== Plot summary ==
Each episode features Cade Courtley with a group of usually five individuals set into the disaster situation. The disasters feature worst-case scenarios, with Courtley giving the individuals advice on how to survive based on the situation, also giving tips to the audience on survival. This always includes interviews with experts and survivors of similar disasters. On occasion the show may describe two or more different scenarios within the same disaster (being caught at different distances from a nuclear blast, being held under different circumstances during a home invasion/hostage situation or escaping different pandemics). In these cases, Courtley still participates as a member of both scenario groups simultaneously. Sometimes an individual in a group can make rash choices that would lead to consequences in which they don't listen to Cade's warnings, making surviving a disaster more difficult.

== Episodes aired ==
- "Hijack" (2009-09-02)
- "Fire" (2009-09-09)
- "Hurricane" (2009-09-16)
- "Home Invasion" (2009-09-23)
- "Avalanche" (2009-09-30)
- "Lost at Sea" (2009-10-07)
- "Mall Shooting" (2009-10-14)
- "Nuclear Attack" (2009-10-21)
- "Earthquake" (2009-11-04)
- "Pandemic" (2009-11-11)
