= Scott Helvenston =

United States Navy SEAL (1965–2004)

Stephen "Scott" Helvenston

Personal details
- Born: June 21, 1965 Ocala, Florida, US
- Died: March 31, 2004 (aged 38) Fallujah, Iraq

Military service
- Allegiance: United States
- Branch/service: US Navy
- Years of service: 1982–1994
- Rank: Quartermaster first class

Stephen "Scott" Helvenston (June 21, 1965 – March 31, 2004) was a US Navy SEAL. He was working as a security contractor for Blackwater Security when he was killed in the 31 March 2004 Fallujah ambush within days of arriving in Iraq.

Helvenston was a personal trainer for Hollywood celebrities such as Demi Moore (for G.I. Jane), and was also featured in the reality shows Combat Missions and Man vs. Beast (in the latter, he completed an obstacle course faster than a chimpanzee). He also starred in a reality series called Extreme Expeditions: Model Behavior months before he left for Iraq. The series was shot in Mexico and was finished, but never aired.

Helvenston's great-great-uncle was Secretary of War Elihu Root.

Helveston joined the Navy at 17 and received orders to Basic Underwater Demolition/SEAL training (BUD/S) at Naval Amphibious Base Coronado. He became the youngest person to complete Navy SEAL training. He graduated with BUD/S class 122 in 1983 and then attended Basic Airborne School at Fort Benning, Georgia. Following SEAL Tactical Training (STT) and completion of six month probationary period, he received the Navy Enlisted Classification (NEC) 5326 as a Combatant Swimmer (SEAL), entitled to wear the Special Warfare insignia. He spent 12 years in the Navy SEALs until he left in 1994 as an E-6 (Quartermaster First Class).

Helvenston began training at Blackwater USA's facilities in March 2004, and developed a personal conflict with head trainer Justin "Shrek" McQuown. Helvenston arrived in Kuwait on March 18, where he was under the management of John and Kathy Potter, whom he knew from Combat Missions.

== Contract ==
Employee John Potter had helped Blackwater Security (since renamed Academi) win the contract to provide security for kitchen equipment convoys for the Kuwait company Regency Hotel and Hospital Company and Eurest Support Services (ESS was a subcontractor of Halliburton KBR). The contract billed Regency $815 a day; Helvenston and the other contractors were paid $600 a day.

The original contract called for at least three men per vehicle on security missions "with a minimum of two armored vehicles to support ESS movements". In addition, the contract called for a heavily armed rear gunner, and time before any mission to review the route and conduct a risk assessment and pre-trip inspection.

Blackwater signed a revised contract with Regency on March 12, 2004 that removed the word "armored". Potter insisted that his men be given armored vehicles, however, and was removed as project manager on March 24, replaced by Justin McQuown.

== McQuown ==
On March 27, two days before Helvenston's scheduled deployment to Iraq, McQuown reassigned him to a team leaving on the 28th, over the objections of numerous other Blackwater employees. Helvenston believed McQuown resented him and deliberately reassigned Helvenston at the last minute. In one of Helvenston's final emails before his death, he wrote to the owner of Blackwater, claiming McQuown's behavior was "very manipulative, duplicitive [sic], immature and unprofessional," with the hidden agenda "Lets [sic] see if we can screw with Scott."

On March 30, McQuown sent Helvenston out with three other contractors, Jerry Zovko, Wesley Batalona and Michael Teague, to guard a convoy for ESS traveling from Baghdad to a military base west of Fallujah. They were in two unarmored vehicles and had no map.

== Death ==
Along with squad members Jerry Zovko, Wesley Batalona and Michael Teague, Helvenston was transporting food and other equipment in unarmored vehicles to the center of the city of Fallujah, when the team was ambushed by insurgents. The four contractors were killed with grenades and small arms fire. Their bodies were dragged from the vehicles, beaten and set ablaze. The corpses were burned and mutilated, and were then dragged through the streets, with two hung from a bridge spanning the Euphrates.

Photos of the event were released to news agencies worldwide.

== Aftermath ==
The families of the four dead contractors, led by Helvenston's mother Katy Helvenston-Wettengel and Jerry Zovko's mother Donna Zovko, filed suit against Blackwater with lawyer Daniel Callahan on January 5, 2005 (Helvenston et al. v. Blackwater Security), alleging wrongful death. Blackwater responded by counter-suing for $10 million.

In January 2011, both cases were thrown out of court by a federal judge. Counsel for the plaintiffs announced they would appeal the ruling. Early in January 2012, the Fourth Circuit Court of Appeals ended the lawsuit with the families of the victims reaching a confidential settlement from the company.
