= Multiple integrated laser engagement system =

Military training tool using lasers

The multiple integrated laser engagement system, or MILES, is used by the U.S. military and other armed forces around the world for training purposes. It uses lasers and blank cartridges to simulate actual battle.

Individual soldiers carry small laser sensors scattered over their bodies, which detect when the soldier has been illuminated by a firearm's laser. Each laser transmitter is set to mimic the effective range of the weapon on which it is used. When a person is "hit", a medic can use the digital readout to determine which first aid method to practice.

Different versions of MILES systems are available to both US and international militaries. The capabilities of the individual systems can vary significantly but in general all modern systems carry information about the shooter, weapon and ammunition in the laser. When this information is received by the target, the target's MILES system uses a random number roll and a casualty probability lookup table to determine the outcome. For example, a MILES transmitter emulating an M16 rifle cannot harm an armored personnel carrier (APC), but could still "kill" a commander visible in the hatch of the vehicle.

Vehicles are typically outfitted with a belt of laser sensors or individual wireless detectors. Dismounted soldiers often wear a vest or harness with sensors as well as a "halo" of sensors on their helmets. MILES systems can be coupled with a real-time data link allowing position and event data to be transmitted back to a central site for data collection and display. More sophisticated systems for tanks and APCs exist that use various techniques (including scanning lasers and coupled radio systems) to allow more precise targeting of armored vehicles.

The standard is maintained by the U.S. Army's PEO-STRI branch.

== Early versions ==
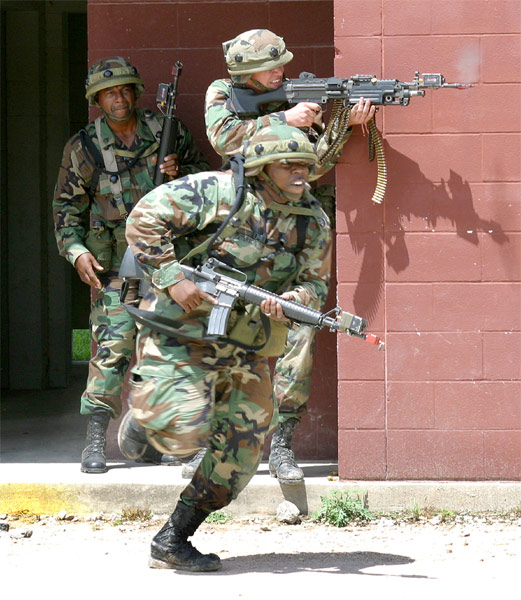
MILES simulation (note the laser emitters attached to the rifles' barrels, and the laser receptors on the soldiers' helmets and harnesses)

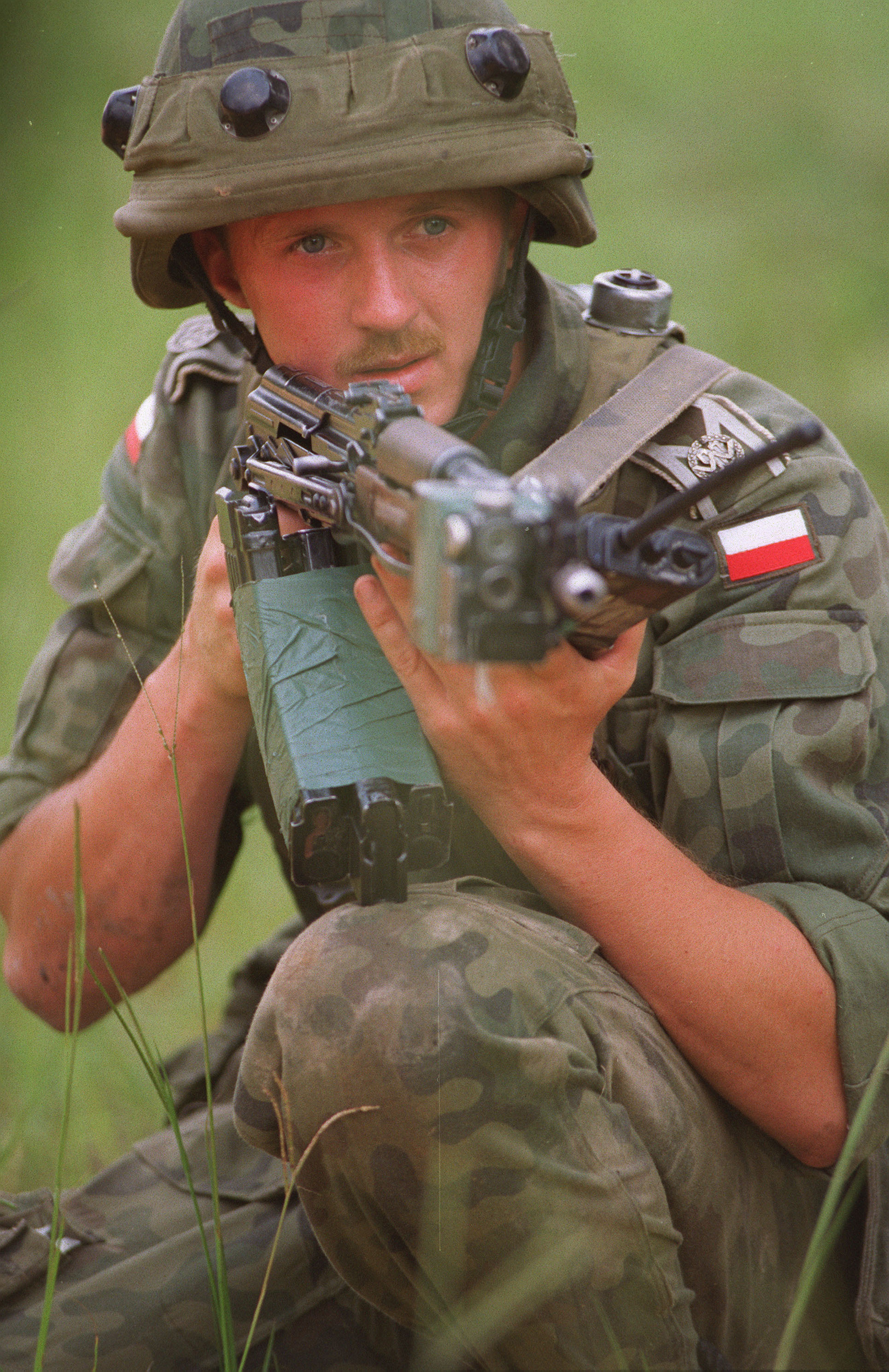
Polish Soldier with MILES gear, AKMS and three magazines taped together jungle style

MILES was introduced to the U.S. Army for direct-fire, force-on-force training capability at home stations and combat training centers during operational testing in 1978 and 1979 following the conclusion of the US Army's Engineering Development program awarded to Xerox Electro-Optical Systems. The goal of the program was to design and build a tactical training system that simulates the weapons, weapon characteristics and effects of a family of weapon systems including infantry, armor and aircraft, with an initial design of 11 systems including rifles, tank guns, and missiles.

MILES systems used a laser module which was mounted to the barrel of a real weapon, a blank-firing adaptor for the weapon, and an integrated receiver consisting of sensors on the helmet and load-bearing vests of the soldiers. When a blank shot was fired by a weapon, it caused the laser to fire a coded burst in the direction that the weapon was aimed. If that burst was sensed by the receiver of another soldier, the "hit" soldier's gear beacon made a beeping noise to let them know they were "dead". MILES had serious problems—when hit, the receiver did not prevent the further firing of the weapon, and it was tempting and easy for soldiers to "cheat" by turning the receivers off and back on again, resetting the system and therefore "respawning" or "resurrecting" themselves. In addition, no data about the engagement was kept so it was impossible to positively identify who shot whom on the battlefield, a critical piece of information when attempting to develop new tactics. MILES was also very encumbering and soldiers sometimes experienced neck pain when using it.

In 1981, Simulaser Corporation was founded by two entrepreneur engineers and began operations near Los Angeles to develop "Advanced MILES" training systems. Under initial contracts from Sandia National Labs, Simulaser produced standard MILES replacement laser transmitters and man-worn detector systems as well as "Advanced MILES" devices that incorporated player identification and scoring systems. These Advanced MILES systems made use of the CMOS 146800-series embedded controllers that had just become available at that time. The systems interleaved unique player identification codes within the weapon code bits transmitted by the laser, which were then stored by the receiver system of any player that was hit. Those systems utilized a controller gun to initialize each player, thus preventing players from "resurrecting" themselves by re-inserting the yellow weapon key. Each player's data was stored in memory until downloaded by the controller unit at the conclusion of the training exercise. Simulaser made use of hybrid microcircuits to reduce the size of certain components and eliminated the electronic module on the back of the helmet to improve player comfort. Simulaser also manufactured laser detector components and systems for vehicle applications sold to Sandia Labs and EG&G Inc., the operations and maintenance contractor at Kirtland AFB for use in training guards and couriers. Simulaser was acquired by Applied Solar Energy Corp. (ASEC, City of Industry, CA), its major supplier of silicon detectors, in 1984. Later, under contract from Fairchild-Weston Systems, Simulaser produced the laser and detector systems for the AGES/ADII (Air-to-Ground Engagement System/Air Defense II) program for the US Army, outfitting a number of helicopters with training systems and producing laser simulators for the HGSS/GVLLD (Hellfire Ground Support System Simulator/Ground-based Vehicle Laser Locator Designator).

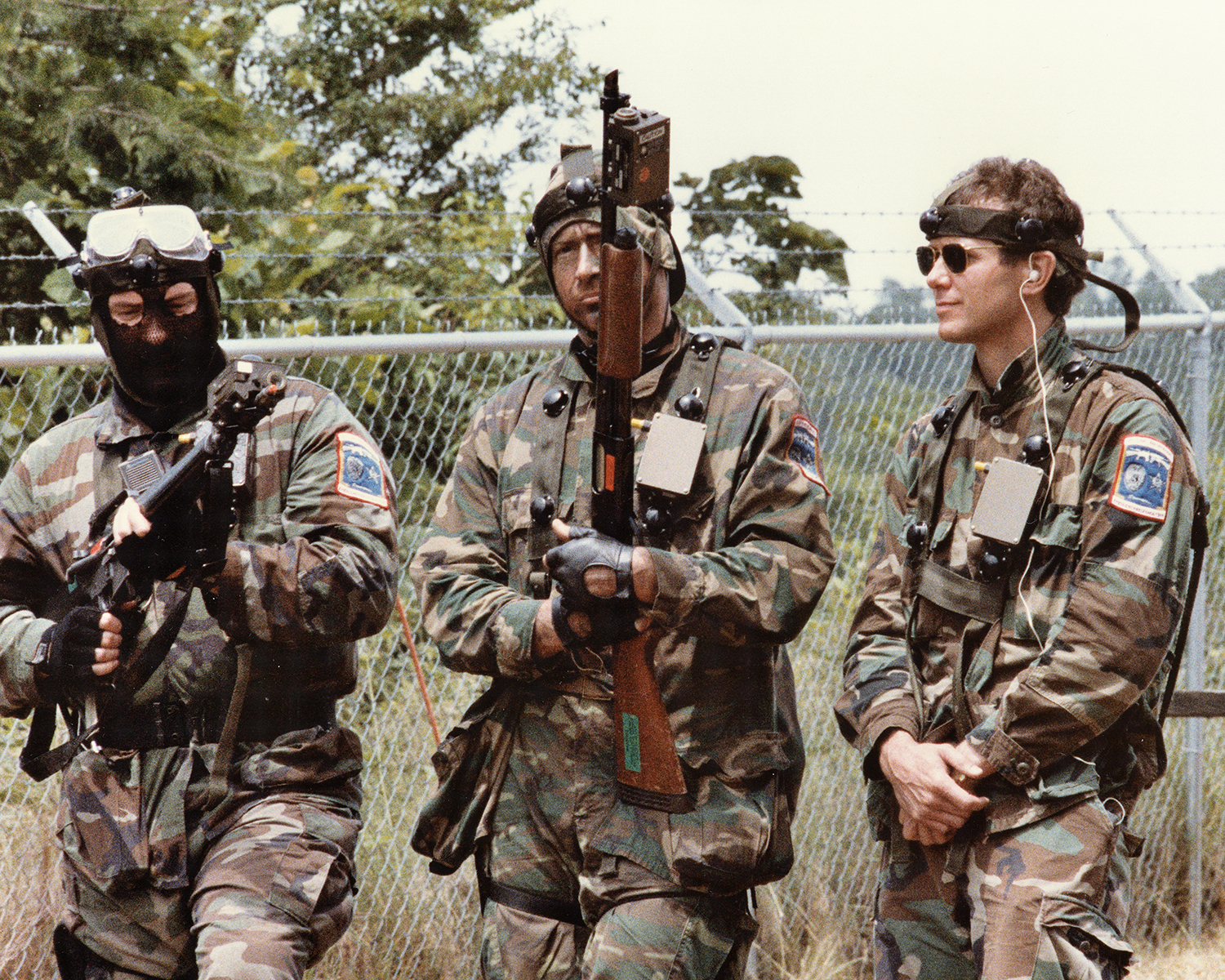
Police SWAT team preparing for training with the Simulaser Man-Worn system

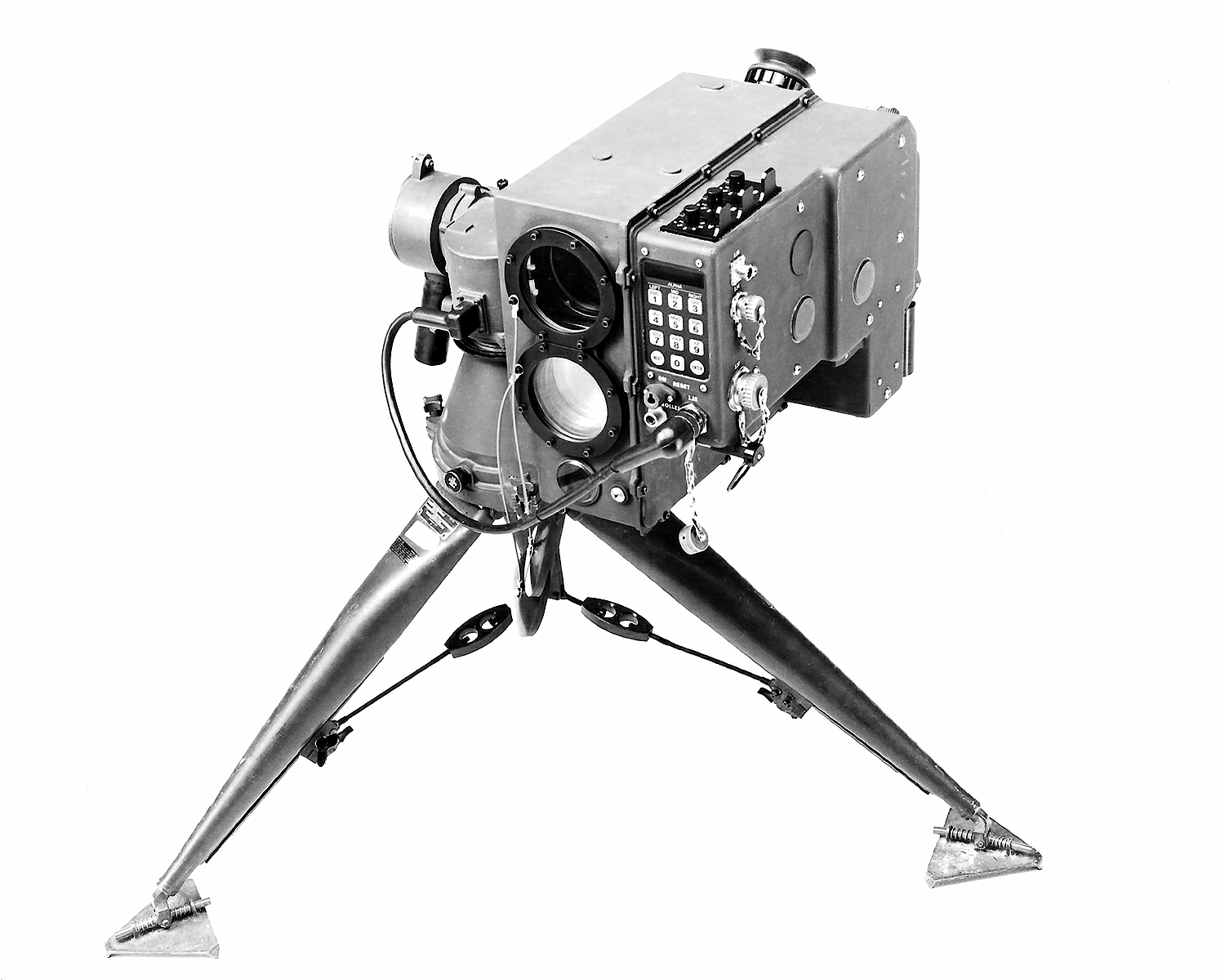
Simulaser's HGSS/GVLLD simulator

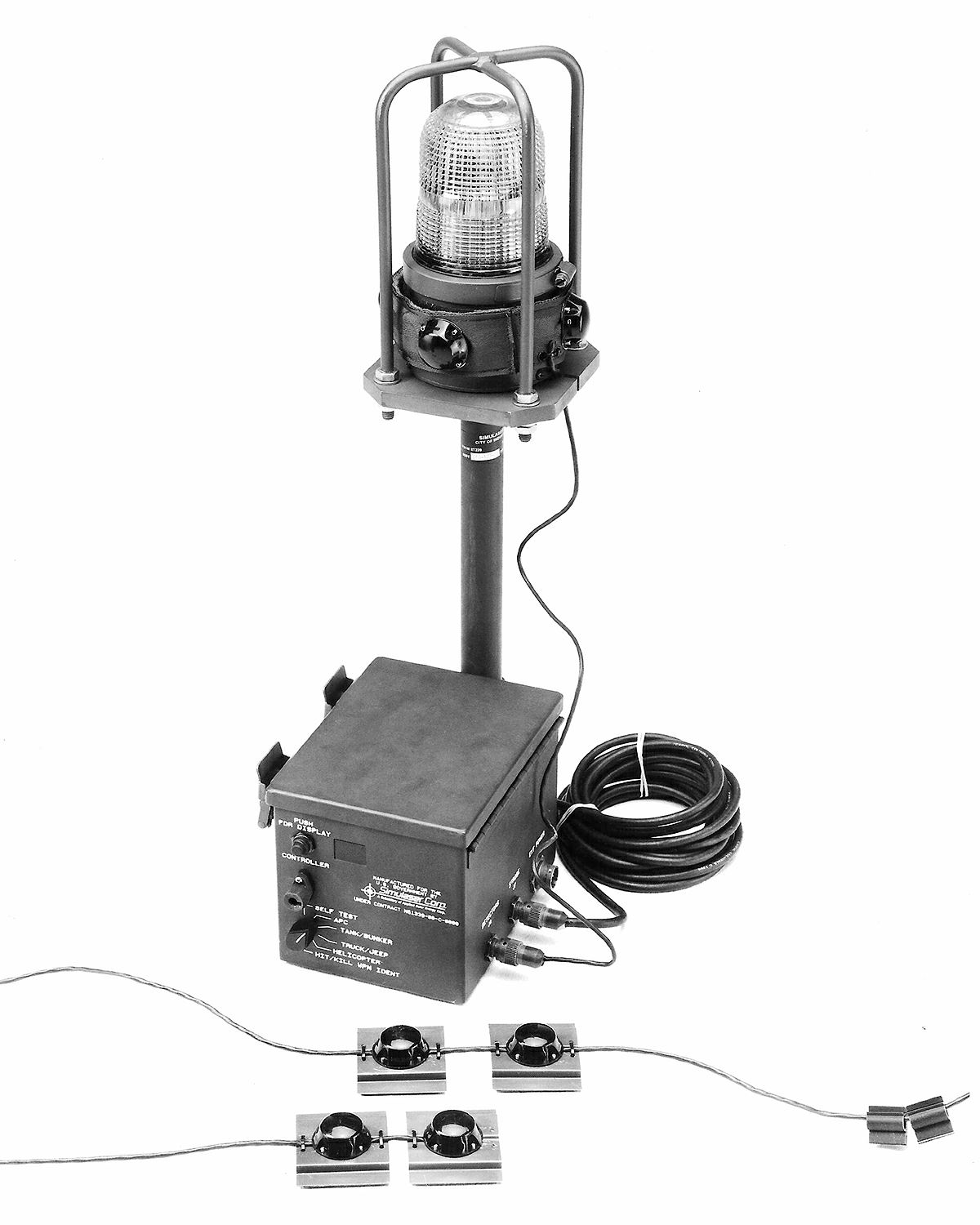
Simulaser's MITS unit

Simulaser also produced the early low rate of production run of MITS (Multiple Independent Target System) and in 1989 won a development contract from the US Army for STOM (Shoot-through Obscuration Miles) that utilized long-wavelength lasers instead of semiconductor lasers in order to penetrate battlefield obscurants. Late in 1989, Simulaser was awarded a $35 million production contract for standard MILES gear, subsequently increased to $44 million, following which Loral Electro-Optical Systems, Inc., acquired the business of Simulaser from ASEC in October 1989, after which Simulaser ceased to exist.

== Later versions ==
Versions made after 1986 used a loud tone to signal when a soldier was "killed". In order to turn off the noise, the soldier had to remove a yellow key from the laser module on his rifle and insert it into the box on his harness. By removing the key from the laser, the weapon could no longer score hits using the MILES system. With some systems the hit soldier is required to lie on his back to stop the noise and signal others that he is "dead".

MILES 2 was released in 1991–92, and the SAWE (simulated area weapons effects) add-on was first fielded in 1992 using GPS and RF messages so that vehicles and individual soldiers can be killed from a central location due to artillery strikes, or nuclear, biological, and chemical weapons strikes. Implementation in the Summer and Fall of 1992 was at Hohenfels, Germany at the Combat Maneuver Training Center. In 1993, the range at Fort Polk was installed and tested. At the time, there were plans to add SAWE at the NTC at Fort Irwin, although instead this was implemented by using SAWE-like features via the DCI radio network. This was superseded in aircraft by the implementation of the SMODIM or the smart onboard data interface module instrumented in 1998 at all three Combat Training Centers (NTC, JRTC, and JMRC).

As of July 2006, the latest version of MILES was MILES XXI, provided by Lockheed Martin.

As of July 2012, the latest version of soldier worn MILES in the US is MILES IWS2, provided by Cubic Corporation.

As of 2012 the most current version of fully fielded vehicle platform MILES was the Instrumentable multiple integrated laser engagement system combat vehicle tactical engagement simulation system I-MILES CVTESS). This is provided to the US Army by Saab Defense and Security Training and Simulations. It is manufactured at Saab Training in the company's office in Husqvarna, Sweden. Saab's Main Battle Tank (MBT) Crew Trainer enables the warfighter to perform live precision gunnery and combat training.

I-MILES CVTESS is a laser-based training device to be used on Abrams, Bradley, and opposing forces (OPFOR) tanks and fighting vehicles to provide real-time casualty effects. It is an evolutionary approach for replacing older I-MILES CVTESS equipment currently used in force-on-force training exercises with devices that provide better training fidelity for combat vehicle systems. It reinforces crew duties, rewards proper engagement techniques and develop tactical maneuver skills of armor and mechanized infantry combined arms teams up to brigade level. It provides unit commanders an integrated training system in force-on-force and force-on-target training events at homestation training area through instrumented training. The system interfaces with instrumentation systems at maneuver combat training centers (MCTC).

== Users ==
Private companies

S&S Training Solutions LLC

In early 2019 S&S Training Solutions LLC, a Combat Infantry Veteran owned & operated tactical training small business, procured MILES 2000 (Cubic Defense Applications) for use in its force-on-force training programs, making them the second known company to make this system available to the American citizen.

One Shepherd, a division of TacComp Media, LLC, procured MILES 2000 (Cubic Defense Applications) in early 2007 as a force on force simulation platform for their vocational leadership education program. One Shepherd employs the system to teach leadership through the military decision-making process (MDMP) inherent in tactical patrolling operations and small arms gun fighting. MILES provides immediate feedback to students in a safe-to-fail environment, and affords an experiential exploration of leadership.

- In late 2013 One Shepherd purchased MILES IWS (Universal Systems and Technology Inc.) and now employ both variants in their educational program.
- Numerous private training companies have purchased MILES through Homeland Security grant. The terms of the grant significantly restrict the use of MILES by civilian citizens. Nuclear security police contracted under the US Department of Energy represent the largest non-defense market for MILES.

=== National militaries ===
- Armenia
- Australia (Enhanced System by Cubic Defence NZ Limited, part of Cubic Corporation)
- Bosnia and Herzegovina
- Brazil
- Bulgaria
- Canada
- Chile
- Colombia
- Croatia
- Czech Republic
- Egypt
- Estonia
- Finland
- Georgia
- Germany (uses own system called Ausbildungsgerät Duellsimulator (AGDUS)
- Hungary
- India (Cubic Defence NZ Limited, part of Cubic Corporation)
- Ireland
- Iran (Uses indigenous designed and manufactured system, similar to MILES)
- Israel (for urban warfare training)
- Kenya
- Latvia
- Lithuania
- Mexico (uses own system called SAVLE (in Spanish Sistema de Adiestramiento Laser Virtual Electromecánico)
- Netherlands
- Norway (uses a similar system manufactured by Saab AB)
- Poland
- Romania
- Serbia
- Singapore (Enhanced system by Cubic Defence NZ Limited, part of Cubic Corporation)
- Slovenia
- Slovakia
- South Korea
- Spain (uses a similar system, Simulador de Combate Individual by Tecnobit)
- Sweden
- Switzerland (Uses a similar system called SIMFASS, built by RUAG and/or Thales, depending on version)
- Thailand ((Enhanced system by Cubic Defence NZ Limited, part of Cubic Corporation); the civilian edition of the system has become a game in Thailand)
- Turkey
- Ukraine (provided by the United States)
- United States

== See also ==
- Laser tag
- Military exercise
- Opposing force
- Small Arms Weapons Effects Simulator
