= Cosmopolitan TV (Canadian TV channel) =

- CosmopolitanTV logo
- Country: Canada
- Broadcast area: Nationwide
- Headquarters: Toronto, Ontario

Programming
- Language: English
- Picture format: 1080i (HDTV) (2013–2019); 480i (SDTV) (2008–2019)

Ownership
- Owner: Corus Entertainment (67%); Hearst Communications (33%) (Cosmopolitan Television Canada Company)

History
- Launched: February 14, 2008; 18 years ago
- Closed: September 30, 2019; 6 years ago

Cosmopolitan TV (also known as CosmoTV) was a Canadian English language specialty television channel.

CosmoTV broadcast shows aimed at women ages 18–34. The channel's name and concept was licensed from and based on the American women's magazine Cosmopolitan. Like the magazine, the broadcast had a particular focus on sex, relationships, fashion, and beauty in the form of entertainment and lifestyle programming, ranging from comedies, dramas, reality programs, films, and more.

The channel was owned by Corus Entertainment and Cosmopolitan owner, Hearst Communications (Cosmopolitan Television Canada Company). The channel ceased operations on September 30, 2019.

== History ==
On August 7, 2007, Cosmopolitan Television Canada Company, a subsidiary of Corus Entertainment and Hearst Corporation, was granted approval for a television broadcasting licence by the Canadian Radio-television and Telecommunications Commission (CRTC) for a channel called Cosmopolitan Television, described as "a national, English-language Category 2 specialty programming service devoted to programming related to relationships, lifestyle, beauty, trends and style. The service shall focus on the interests and needs of young working women aged between 18 and 34 years."

This was the company's second attempt at receiving approval for a broadcast licence to launch CosmoTV. The company's first attempt was denied by the CRTC earlier that year due to concerns that the channel would be in direct competition to several existing television specialty channels that have genre exclusivity, protecting them from direct competition.

In seeking approval for permission to launch the service, the company's second attempt included a number of proposed restrictions to ensure that the service would not directly compete with protected services. The CRTC was satisfied with the second attempt's safeguards and approved the application.

The channel was launched on February 14, 2008 as CosmopolitanTV.

In July 2019, various cable operators reported that the channel would be shut down alongside IFC on September 30, 2019.
