= Steven Ward (TV personality) =

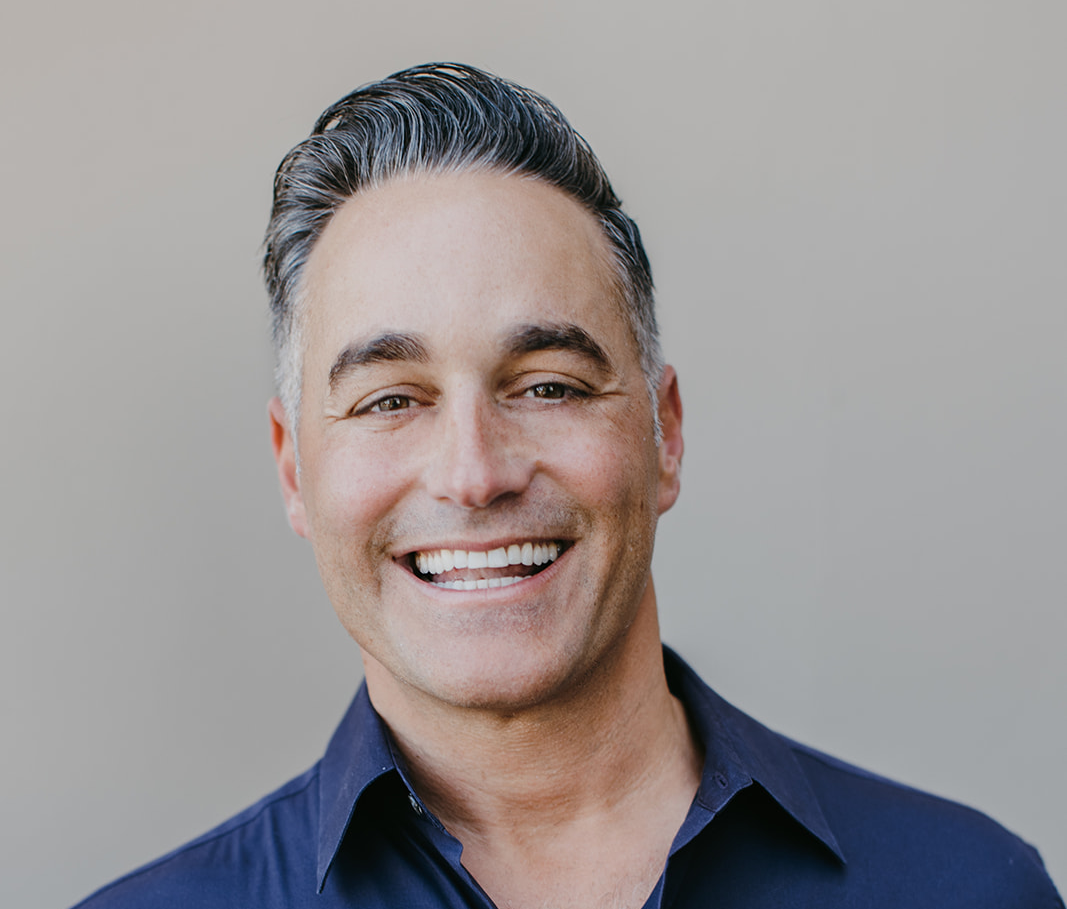
- Ward in November 2022
- Born: Steven Brandon Ward; November 12, 1980 (age 45); Philadelphia, Pennsylvania, U.S.
- Spouse: Madison Ward

Steven Brandon Ward (born November 12, 1980) is an American television presenter, matchmaker, and entrepreneur. He is the host and executive producer of the show Tough Love, an American reality television series, which aired on VH1 from 2009 until 2013.

== Early life and education ==
Ward was born in Philadelphia, Pennsylvania, on November 12, 1980. For most of his youth, Ward lived throughout southeastern Pennsylvania. In fall of 1993, his family relocated to Northern Virginia. He attended Fairfax High School in Fairfax, Virginia, where he played junior varsity football and wrestling, and varsity lacrosse, and graduated in 1998.

Ward attended Drexel University in Philadelphia, where he majored in international business major and minored in French. He graduated in 2003.

== Career ==
After graduating from Drexel University, Ward worked as a mortgage broker during the refinance boom of the 2000s.

Ward began his training as a matchmaker at a very young age. Shortly after graduating college he joined his mother JoAnn Ward in her private Philadelphia area based matchmaking business, It's About Time! Master Matchmaker. He soon rebranded the company, Master Matchmakers and expanded the business throughout the Mid Atlantic.

In 2007, High Noon Entertainment approached Ward to develop a dating show. In 2008, Drew Barrymore's Flower Films and High Noon Entertainment hired Ward to host VH1 Tough Love. Ward hosted several seasons of the show.

In 2009, Ward co-authored a book with his mother, Crash Course in Love, which was published by Pocket Books, a division of Simon and Schuster.

In April 2012, Ward was nominated as one Philadelphia Business Journal's "40 Under 40", which recognizes local young professionals for outstanding success and contributions to the Philadelphia community. The winners were selected from more than 250 nominations. On September 13, 2013, Ward launched a prototype of a free mobile application, Love Lab on Android and iOS in an effort to verify online dating with knowledge based authentication, background checks and video chat. As one of 24 participants in a venture capitalist pitch competition called, Node Jam, Love Lab won the crowd favorite award on a promise to rebuild the application using a MEAN Stack. In March 2014, Ward founded LoveLab.com INC as a Delaware C-corp.

In April 2014, he formally partnered with Jon Kraft, a Founder of Pandora Radio and Girish Venkat, the original Chief Software Architect at Stamps, through their development firm, LiftOff LLC. On February 11, 2015, a new Love Lab was launched for iOS, including facial recognition, background checks, ephemeral messaging, and more. In October 2017, Ward announced that he had launched a new startup, Authenticating.com, which provides developer tools for identity verification and fraud prevention. His first customer was publicly traded, Canada based, Namaste Technologies. On April 1, 2022, Authenticating.com was rebranded as Authenticate.

Ward has served as a spokesperson for brands, including Pantene Procter & Gamble and Crowne Plaza Hotels (IHG Hotels & Resorts) and has spoken to college audiences at Ohio State University, Slippery Rock University, Chapman University, University of California, Long Beach, University of California, Irvine, and Drexel University and to business leaders and audiences in casinos and other venues. On March 23, 2019, he spoke in a lightning talk at the 2019 Know Conference on "Building Better Trust Scores".

== Personal life ==
On November 16, 2013, Ward proposed to his longtime girlfriend, Madison Pard.
