= Tough Love (TV series) =

- Also known as: Tough Love: Co-Ed
- Genre: Reality
- Presented by: Steven Ward; JoAnn Ward
- Country of origin: United States
- Original language: English
- No. of seasons: 6
- No. of episodes: 60

Production
- Executive producers: Jim Berger; Nancy Juvonen; Drew Barrymore; Ember Truesdell; Chris Miller; Steve Ward; JoAnn Ward; Richard Hall; Elizabeth Grizzle Voorhees; Jill Holmes; Kristen Kelly; Laurel Stier
- Running time: 42 minutes
- Production companies: Flower Films; High Noon Entertainment

Original release
- Network: VH1
- Release: March 15, 2009 – October 23, 2013

Tough Love is an American reality television series that aired on VH1 and premiered on March 15, 2009. The host and matchmaker of the show is Steven Ward of Philadelphia-based Master Matchmakers. Steven Ward's mother, JoAnn Ward, offers relationship advice.

== Season 1 ==
The first season premiered on March 15, 2009, and featured eight women seeking relationship help.

== Season 2 ==
The second season premiered on November 15, 2009, and featured nine women seeking relationship help.

== Season 3 ==
The third season was announced before the second season had completed. It was the first season to include couples, and premiered April 12, 2010.

== Season 4 ==
Season 4 of Tough Love Miami premiered on October 2, 2011.

== Season 5 ==
Season 5 of Tough Love was set in New Orleans and premiered in summer 2012

== Season 6 ==
Season 6 features both guys and girls.
