= Michael A. Monsoor =

US Navy Medal of Honor recipient (1981–2006)

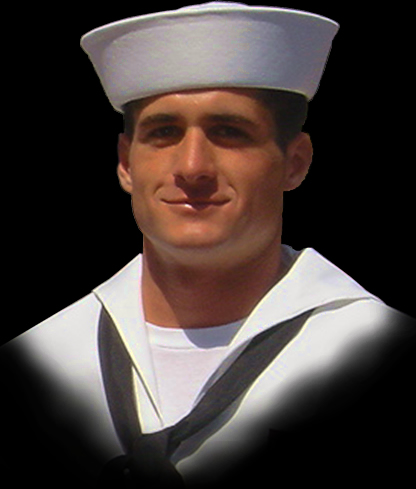
- Born: April 5, 1981; Long Beach, California, United States
- Died: September 29, 2006 (aged 25); Ramadi, Iraq
- Burial place: Fort Rosecrans National Cemetery
- Military career
- Allegiance: United States
- Branch: United States Navy
- Service years: 2001–2006
- Rank: Master at arms second class
- Unit: SEAL Team 3
- Conflicts: Iraq War; Battle of Ramadi †
- Awards: Medal of Honor; Silver Star; Bronze Star Medal; Purple Heart

Michael Anthony Monsoor (April 5, 1981 – September 29, 2006) was a United States Navy SEAL who was killed in Operation Iraqi Freedom during the Battle of Ramadi when he dove onto a live grenade to shield his fellow SEALs, sacrificing his own life. He was posthumously awarded the Medal of Honor. He enlisted in the United States Navy in 2001 and graduated from Basic Underwater Demolition/SEAL Training BUD/S class 250 in 2004. After further training he was assigned to Delta Platoon, SEAL Team 3.

Delta Platoon was sent to Iraq in April 2006 and assigned to train Iraqi Army soldiers in Ramadi. Over the next five months, Monsoor and his platoon frequently engaged in combat with insurgent forces. On September 29, 2006, an insurgent threw a grenade onto a rooftop where Monsoor and several other SEALs and Iraqi soldiers were positioned. Monsoor quickly smothered the grenade with his body, absorbing the resulting explosion and saving his comrades from serious injury or death. Monsoor died about 30 minutes later from his wounds.

Monsoor was posthumously awarded the Medal of Honor, which was presented by President George W. Bush to Monsoor's parents on April 8, 2008. USS Michael Monsoor (DDG-1001), the second ship in the Zumwalt class of guided missile destroyers, was named in his honor.

== Early life and education ==
Monsoor was born April 5, 1981, in Long Beach, California, the third of four children of Sally Ann (Boyle) and George Paul Monsoor. His father also served in the United States military as a Marine. His father is of Lebanese descent, and his mother has Irish ancestry. When he was a child, Monsoor was afflicted with asthma but strengthened his lungs by racing his siblings in the family's swimming pool. He attended Dr. Walter C. Ralston Intermediate School and Garden Grove High School in Garden Grove, California, and played tight end on the school's football team, graduating in 1999.

== Military career ==
=== United States Navy SEALs ===
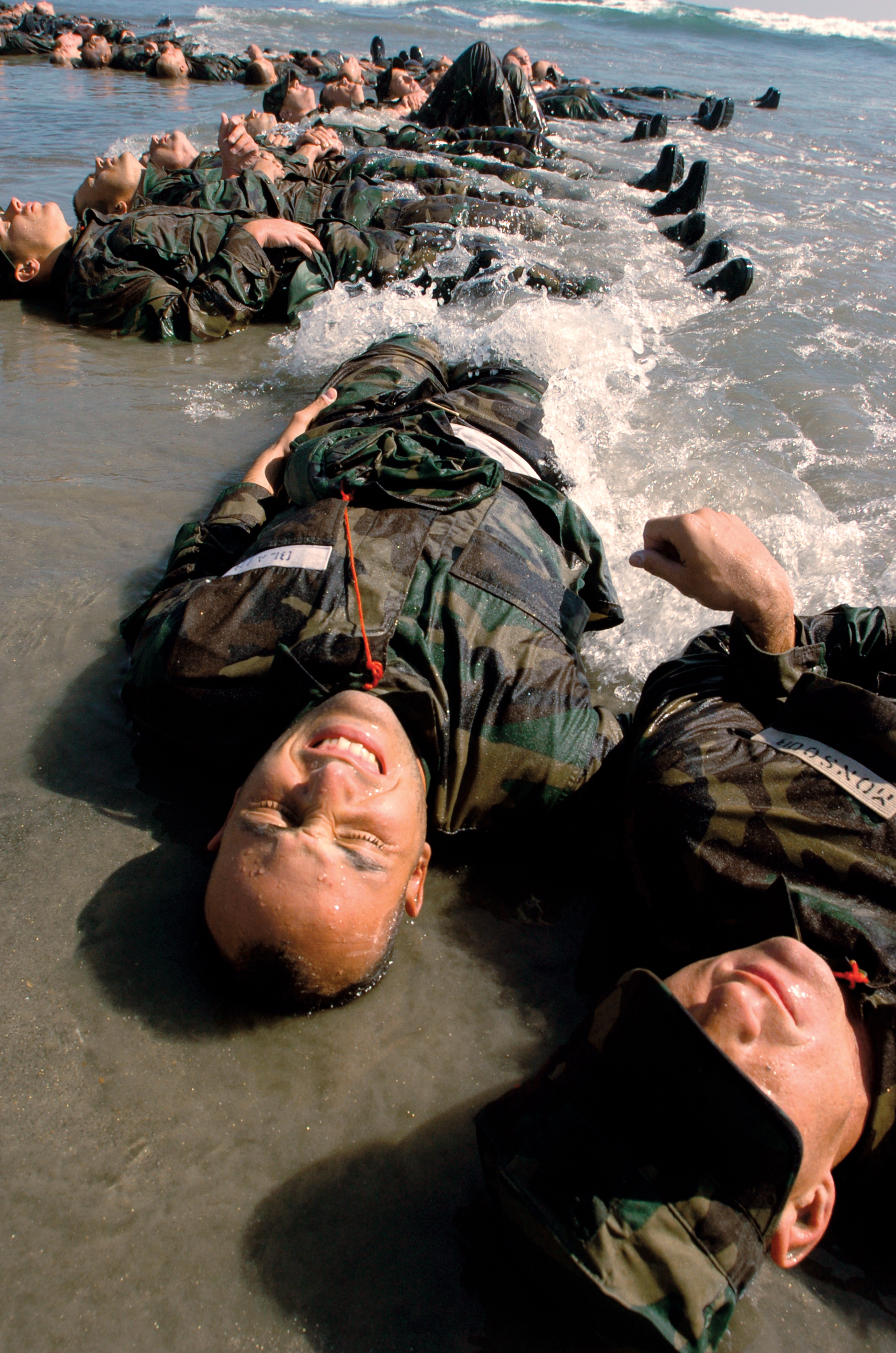
Monsoor (lower right corner) during his SEAL training in August 2004

Monsoor enlisted in the United States Navy on March 21, 2001, and attended Basic Training at Recruit Training Command Great Lakes, Illinois. Upon graduation from basic training, he attended Quartermaster "A" School. He volunteered for Basic Underwater Demolition/SEAL training (BUD/S) at Naval Amphibious Base Coronado. During first phase of training for his class 238, Monsoor voluntarily withdrew from training. Monsoor received assignment as master-at-arms at the Security Detachment in Sigonella, Sicily, from January 2002 to January 2004 and volunteered again for BUD/S training. Monsoor graduated from BUD/S class 250 on September 2, 2004, as one of the top performers in his class. After BUD/S, he completed advanced SEAL training courses including parachute training at Basic Airborne School, cold weather combat training in Kodiak, Alaska, and six months of SEAL Qualification Training (SQT) in Coronado, California, graduating in March 2005. Monsoor received the Navy Enlisted Classification (NEC) 5326 as a Combatant Swimmer (SEAL), entitled to wear the Special Warfare Insignia. The following month, his rating changed from quartermaster to master-at-arms, and he was assigned to Delta Platoon, SEAL Team 3.

==== Iraq War ====
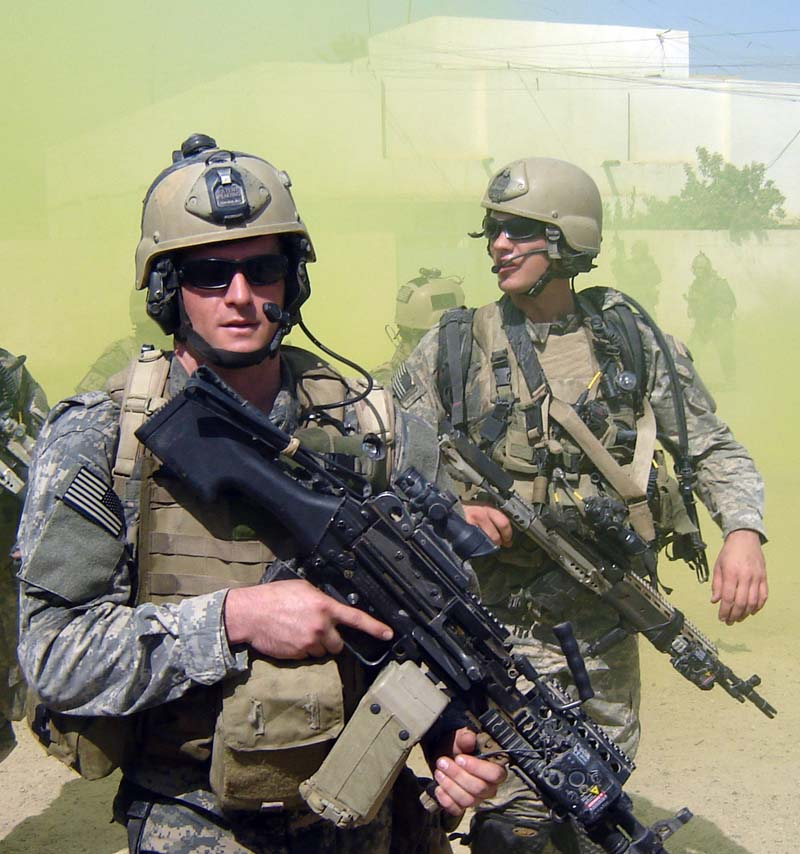
Monsoor in Iraq in 2006

During the Battle of Ramadi, SEAL Team Three was sent to Ramadi, Iraq in April 2006 and assigned to train Iraqi Army soldiers. As a communicator and machine-gunner on patrols, Monsoor carried 100 pounds (45 kg) of gear in temperatures often exceeding 100 °F. He took a lead position to protect the platoon from frontal assault, and the team was frequently involved in battles with insurgent fighters. During the first five months of deployment, that platoon from Team 3 was assigned to Camp Corregidor on the east side of Ramadiq, led by then-Lieutenant Seth Stone, who also earned the Silver Star for his own actions on the same September 29, 2006, operation.

During fighting on May 9, 2006, Monsoor ran into a street while under continuous insurgent gunfire to rescue an injured comrade. Monsoor was awarded the Silver Star for this action, and was also awarded the Bronze Star Medal for his service in Iraq.

== Death ==
On September 29, 2006, Monsoor's platoon shot at four insurgents in a firefight in Ramadi, killing one and injuring another. Anticipating further attacks, Monsoor, three SEAL snipers and three Iraqi Army soldiers took up a rooftop position. Civilians aiding the insurgents blocked off the streets, and a nearby mosque broadcast a message for people to fight against the Americans and the Iraqi soldiers. Monsoor was protecting other SEALs, two of whom were 15 feet away from him. Monsoor's position made him the only SEAL on the rooftop with quick access to an escape route.

A grenade was thrown onto the rooftop by an insurgent on the street below. The grenade hit Monsoor in the chest and fell to the floor. Immediately, Monsoor yelled "Grenade!" and jumped onto the grenade, covering it with his body. The grenade exploded seconds later, and Monsoor's body absorbed most of the force of the blast. Monsoor was severely wounded and although evacuated immediately, he died 30 minutes later. Two other SEALs next to him at the time were injured by the explosion but survived.

Monsoor was described as a "quiet professional" and a "fun-loving guy" by those who knew him. He is buried at Fort Rosecrans National Cemetery in San Diego.

=== Funeral ===
During the funeral, as the coffin was moving from the hearse to the grave site, Navy SEALs were lined up forming a column of twos on both sides of the pallbearers' route, with the coffin moving up the center. As the coffin passed each SEAL, they slapped down the gold Trident each had removed from his uniform and deeply embedded it into the wooden coffin.

The display moved many attending the funeral, including President Bush, who spoke about the incident later during a speech stating: "The procession went on nearly half an hour, and when it was all over, the simple wooden coffin had become a gold-plated memorial to a hero who will never be forgotten."

== Awards and decorations ==
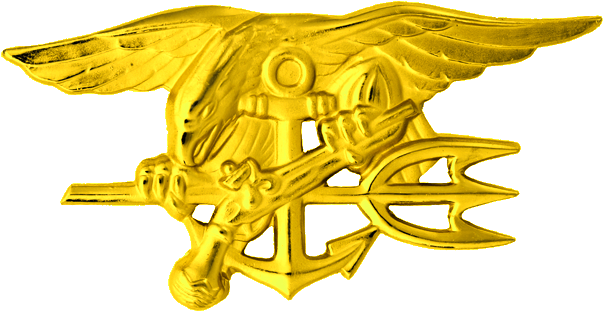

Special Warfare insignia
Medal of Honor		Silver Star
Bronze Star Medal with Combat V	Purple Heart	Combat Action Ribbon
Navy Good Conduct Medal	National Defense Service Medal	Iraq Campaign Medal with star
Global War on Terrorism Expeditionary Medal	Global War on Terrorism Service Medal	Sea Service Deployment Ribbon
Navy & Marine Corps; Overseas Service Ribbon	Navy Expert Rifleman Medal	Navy Expert Pistol Shot Medal
Navy and Marine Corps Parachutist Insignia

=== Medal of Honor ===
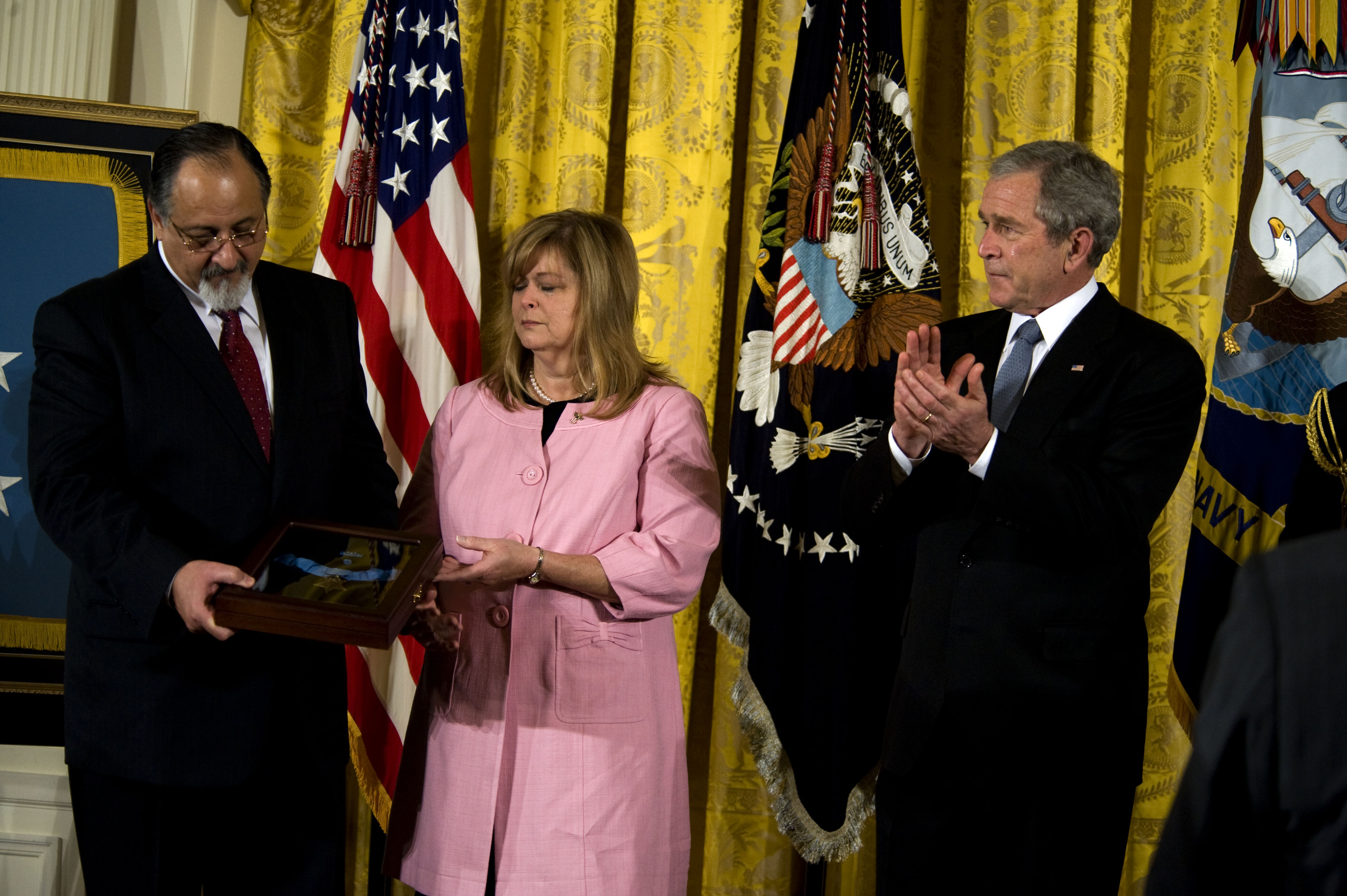
Sally and George Monsoor receive Michael Monsoor's Medal of Honor from President George W. Bush

On March 31, 2008, the United States Department of Defense confirmed that Monsoor would posthumously receive the Medal of Honor. Monsoor's parents, Sally and George Monsoor, received the medal on his behalf at an April 8, ceremony at the White House held by the President. Monsoor became the fourth American servicemember and second Navy SEAL – each killed in the line of duty – to receive the United States' highest military award during the war on terrorism.

==== Medal of Honor citation ====
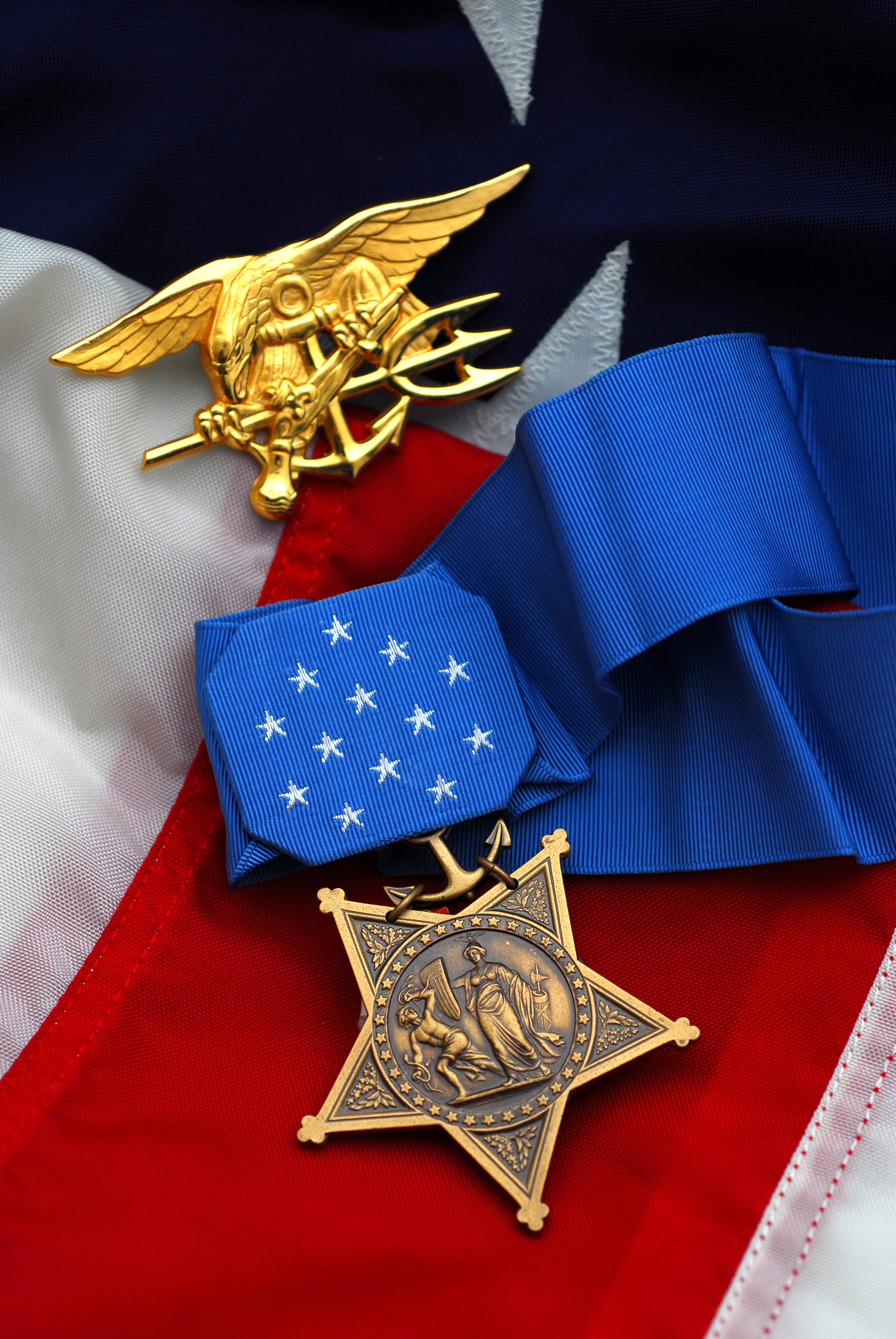
Michael A. Monsoor's Medal of Honor pictured with the Navy Special Warfare (SEAL) Trident.

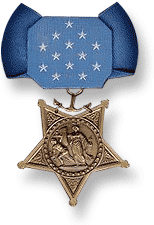

Official citation:

Master at Arms Second-Class (Sea, Air, and Land) Michael A. Mansoor United States Navy For Service Set forth in the Following Citation:

For conspicuous gallantry and intrepidity at the risk of his life above and beyond the call of duty, as automatic weapons gunner for Naval Special Warfare Task Group Arabian Peninsula, in support of Operation Iraqi Freedom on September 29, 2006. As a member of a combined SEAL and Iraqi Army Sniper Overwatch Element, tasked with providing early warning and stand-off protection from a rooftop in an insurgent held sector of Ar Ramadi, Iraq, Petty Officer Monsoor distinguished himself by his exceptional bravery in the face of grave danger. In the early morning, insurgents prepared to execute a coordinated attack by reconnoitering the area around the element’s position. Element snipers thwarted the enemy’s initial attempt by eliminating two insurgents. The enemy continued to assault the element, engaging them with a rocket-propelled grenade and small arms fire. As enemy activity increased, Petty Officer Monsoor took position with his machine gun between two teammates on an outcropping of the roof. While the SEALs vigilantly watched for enemy activity, an insurgent threw a hand grenade from an unseen location, which bounced off Petty Officer Monsoor’s chest and landed in front of him. Although only he could have escaped the blast, Petty Officer Monsoor chose instead to protect his teammates. Instantly and without regard for his own safety, he threw himself onto the grenade to absorb the force of the explosion with his body, saving the lives of his two teammates. By his undaunted courage, fighting spirit, and unwavering devotion to duty in the face of certain death, Petty Officer Monsoor gallantly gave his life for his country, thereby reflecting great credit upon himself and upholding the highest traditions of the United States Naval Service

signed George W. Bush.

== Legacy ==
In 2011, the United States Department of Veterans Affairs honored Monsoor by naming one of the first three named streets at Miramar National Cemetery after him.

=== USS Michael Monsoor (DDG-1001) ===
In October 2008, United States Secretary of the Navy Donald C. Winter announced that the second ship in the Zumwalt class of destroyers would be named USS Michael Monsoor (DDG-1001) in honor of Petty Officer Monsoor.

=== Mountain Warfare Training Camp Michael Monsoor ===
A SEAL training facility—located about 50 miles (80 km) east of San Diego—was renamed Mountain Warfare Training Camp Michael Monsoor.

=== U.S. Naval Sea Cadet Corps ===
There is a U.S. Naval Sea Cadet Corps unit named the "Michael A. Monsoor Battalion" based in Camp Pendleton, California. The unit symbol is composed of Petty Officer Monsoor's Medal of Honor, SEAL Trident, and Master-at-Arms shield. Everyone in the unit knows Petty Officer Michael A. Monsoor's career history and shares it with all new cadets.

=== Garden Grove High School Memorial Stadium ===
As part of modernization, Garden Grove High School, where Michael Monsoor attended, dedicated the newly built stadium to him, naming it "Michael Monsoor Memorial Stadium".

=== Books ===
Monsoor is mentioned in the book by Rorke Denver, Damn Few: Making the Modern SEAL Warrior and has a chapter about his story and is pictured on the cover of the 2008 book The Sheriff of Ramadi: Navy SEALs and the Winning of al-Anbar by Dick Couch.

== See also ==
- List of Medal of Honor recipients
