= Battle of Ramadi (2006) =

2006 battle in the Iraq War

Coordinates: 33.4167°N 43.3000°E

Second Battle of Ramadi (2006)
- Part of the Iraqi civil war and the Iraq War
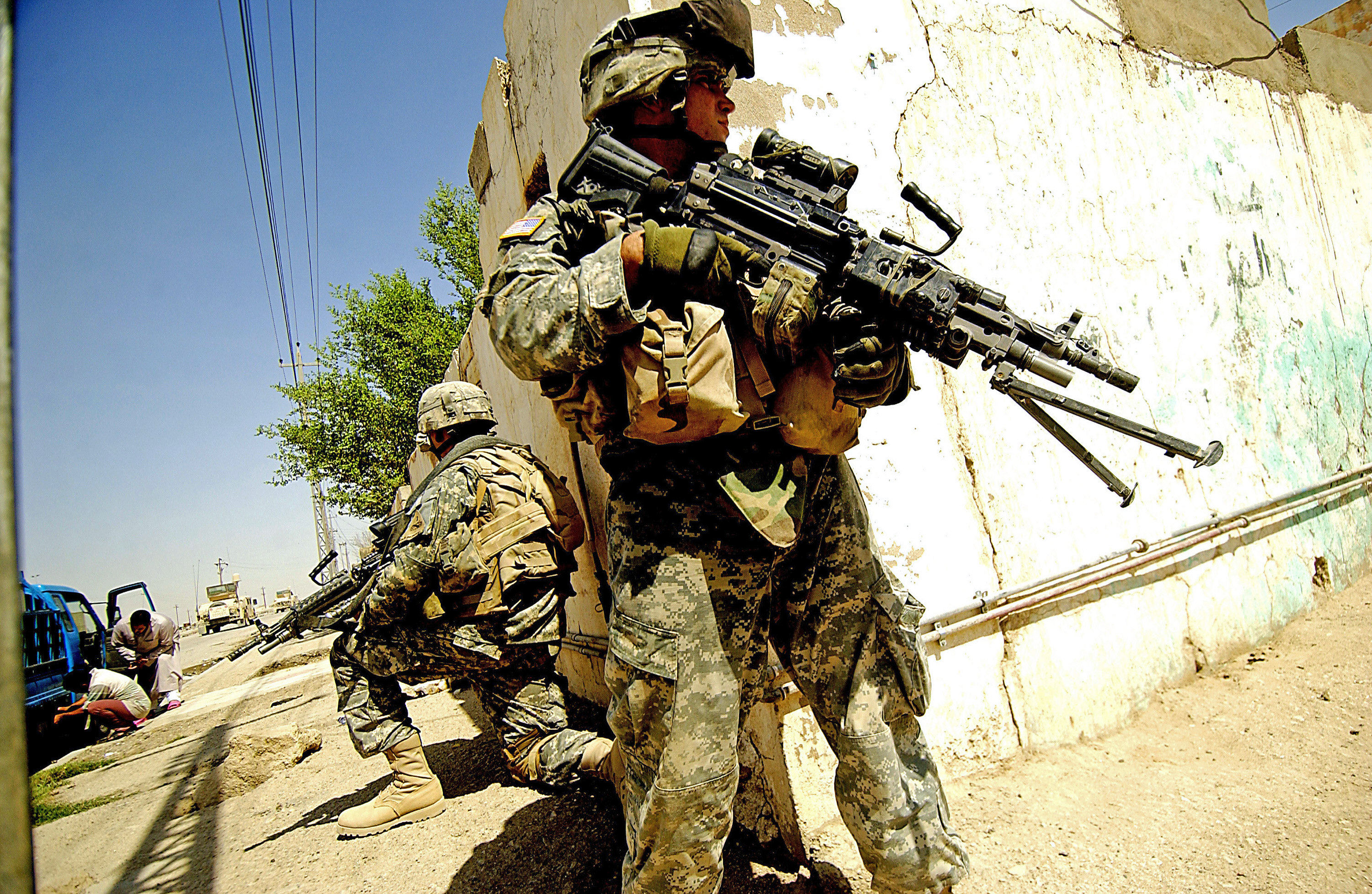
- 1st Armored Division soldiers take up positions on a street corner during a foot patrol in Ramadi, August 2006
Date	March 15 – November 15, 2006 (8 months)
Location	Ramadi, Iraq
Result	Coalition victory

Belligerents
United States; United Kingdom (Iraq) New Iraqi Army	Islamic Army in Iraq Ansar al-Sunna Mujahideen Shura Council: al-Qaeda in Iraq Later reformed as: Islamic State of Iraq

Commanders and leaders
(United States) COL Sean MacFarland (United States) LTC Ronald Clark (United States) LTC Vincent J Tedesco (United States) MAJ Matthew J Van Wagenen (United States) LCDR Jocko Willink (United States) LtCol Stephen Neary	Abu Musab al-Zarqawi †; Abu Omar al-Baghdadi

Strength
(United States) 5,500 troops (United Kingdom) 50 troops	~5,000 insurgents (U.S. estimate)

Casualties and losses
(United States) 80+ killed 200+ wounded (United Kingdom) 8 killed 9 wounded (Iraq) Unknown	749 confirmed killed (roughly 1,100 estimated killed)

The Second Battle of Ramadi was fought during the Iraq War from March 2006 to November 2006, for control of Ramadi, the capital of the Al Anbar Governorate in western Iraq. A joint US military force under the command of 1st Brigade Combat Team, 1st Armored Division; 3rd Battalion, 8th Marines (3/8 Kilo Co., 3/8 Lima Co., 3/8 India Co.); and Iraqi Security Forces fought insurgents for control of key locations in Ramadi. Coalition strategy relied on establishing a number of patrol bases called Combat Operation Posts or "COP's" throughout the city, with the main efforts concentrated at the Government Center, OPVA, Hurricane Point, Blue Diamond, Hospital, and Corrigador.

U.S. military officers, specifically U.S. Army Captain Travis Patriquin, led the outreach effort to tribal leaders, which resulted in the formation of the Anbar Awakening. In August, insurgents executed a tribal sheik who was encouraging his kinsmen to join the Iraqi police and prevented his body from being buried in accordance with Islamic laws. In response, Sunni sheiks banded together to drive insurgents from Ramadi. In September 2006, Sheik Abdul Sattar Abu Risha formed the Anbar Salvation Council, an alliance of approximately 40 Sunni tribes.

U.S. Navy SEAL Michael A. Monsoor was posthumously awarded the Medal of Honor for actions during the battle. On September 29, 2006, he threw himself upon a grenade which threatened the lives of the other members of his team. Monsoor had previously been awarded the Silver Star in May for rescuing an injured comrade in the city.

The battle was marked with the first death of a U.S. Navy SEAL in Iraq, Marc Alan Lee, August 2, 2006.

The battle also marked the first use of chlorine bombs by insurgents during the war. On October 21, 2006, insurgents detonated a car-bomb with two 100-pound chlorine tanks, injuring three Iraqi policemen and a civilian in Ramadi.

In December, while participating in a mounted patrol, south of the intersection of Checkpoint 295 and Route Michigan, a large Improvised Explosive Device detonated directly underneath a military Humvee carrying Army Captain Travis Patriquin, Marine Captain Megan McClung and Army Specialist Vincent Pomonte.

== Background ==
Since the fall of Fallujah in 2004, Ramadi had been the center of the insurgency in Iraq. The Islamic State of Iraq, a front group for al-Qaeda in Iraq, had declared the city to be its capital. The city of 500,000, located 110 kilometres (68 mi) west of Baghdad, was a contested territory between US forces and insurgents. Law and order had broken down, and street battles were common.

== Prelude ==
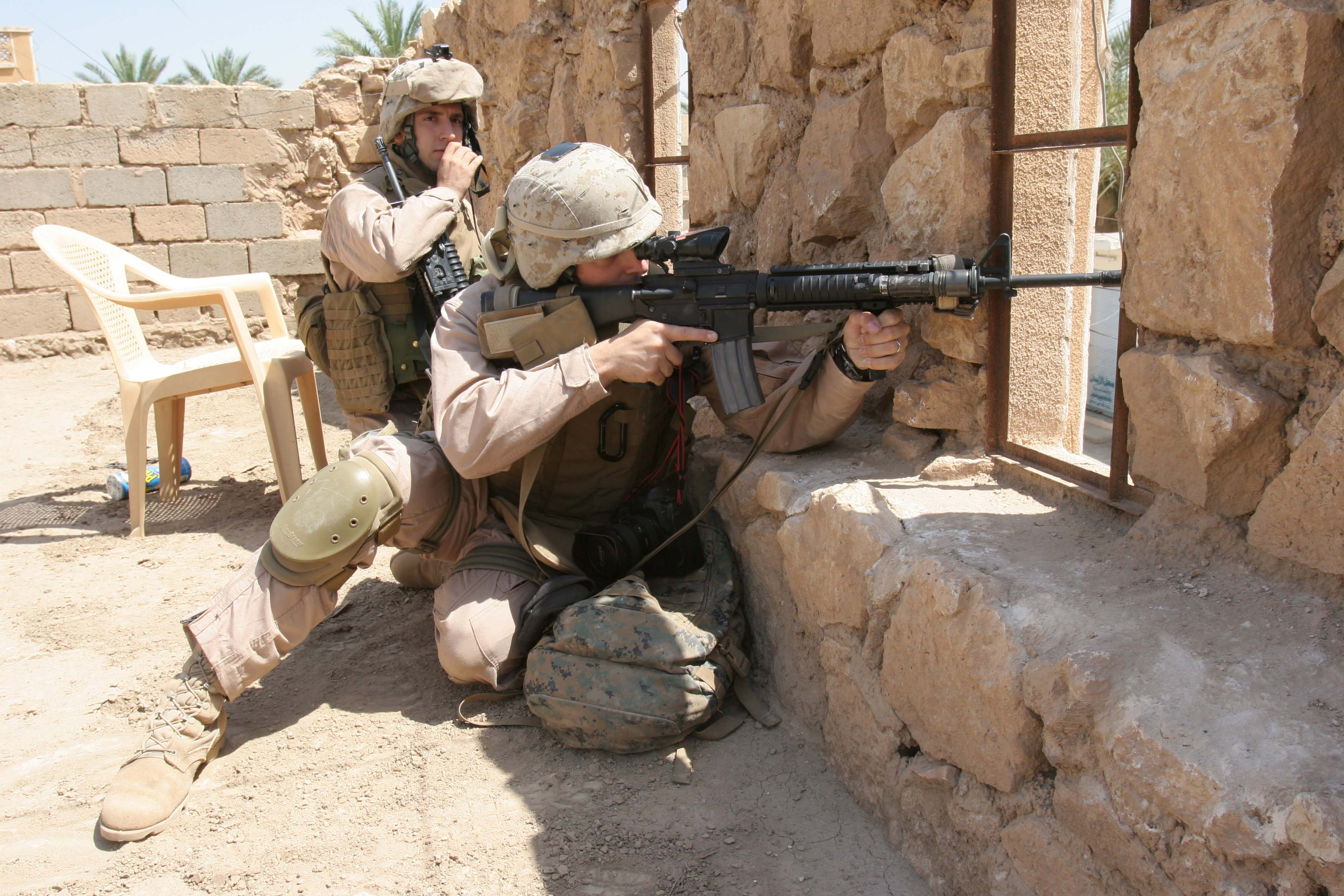
Marines during an operation to prevent and disrupt insurgency activity in Ramadi, April 25, 2006

Since 2005, 2nd Brigade, 28th Infantry Division had responsibility for the area of Ramadi. The Pennsylvania Army National Guard brigade had two attached infantry battalions; 1st Battalion, 506th Infantry Regiment, and the 3rd Battalion, 8th Marine Regiment. In July 2005, they were joined by three detached companies from 3rd Brigade, 3rd Infantry Division: B Co. 1st Battalion, 30th Infantry Regiment, A Co. 1st Battalion, 15th Infantry Regiment, and A Co. 2nd Battalion, 69th Armor Regiment, out of Fort Benning, GA. The units had previously been stationed in eastern Iraq since January 2005. They occupied Camp Corregidor, the Government Center, and COP Trotter upon their shift to Ramadi. Following a very promising Iraqi local election with over 80 percent voter turnout and 2-28 ID's success in recruiting 671 Iraqi police recruits, al-Qaeda in Iraq targeted the city for attacks. On January 5, 2006, AQI conducted a suicide bombing that killed 56 Iraqi police recruits and 2-28 ID's tribal and police engagement officer. A few days later, AQI assassinated half of the tribal leaders of Anbar's People's Committee.

AQI and allied fighters took over large sections of Ramadi following complex attacks on the city center. 2-28 ID conducted battalion-sized sweeps of neighborhoods, killing hundreds of enemy fighters, but the areas would be quickly reoccupied by AQI after the 2-28ID returned to its forward operating bases.

The 2-28 ID had taken heavy casualties, losing 82 soldiers' lives and had an additional 611 soldiers wounded. The brigade had limited intelligence on the enemy and was under resourced for the task at hand. Large areas of the city had no US presence. Soldiers of the brigade were attacked an average of 20 times a day. Aware of a deteriorating security situation, Multi-National Force – Iraq commander General George W. Casey Jr. cancelled a transition of responsibility to Iraqi forces and determined that 2nd Brigade, 28th Infantry Division would be replaced by a much larger US force at the end of their tour in June 2006.

General Casey selected Colonel Sean MacFarland's 1st Brigade Combat Team, 1st Armored Division to relieve the 2-28 ID. The BCT would be augmented by numerous forces including two battalions from 2nd Brigade, 1st Armored Division and various special operations forces, predominately U.S. Navy SEALs. 1st Battalion, 506th Infantry Regiment and 3rd Battalion, 8th Marine Regiment would complete their tour under Colonel MacFarland's command.

== Arrival of the 1st Armored Division and Conduct of Battle ==
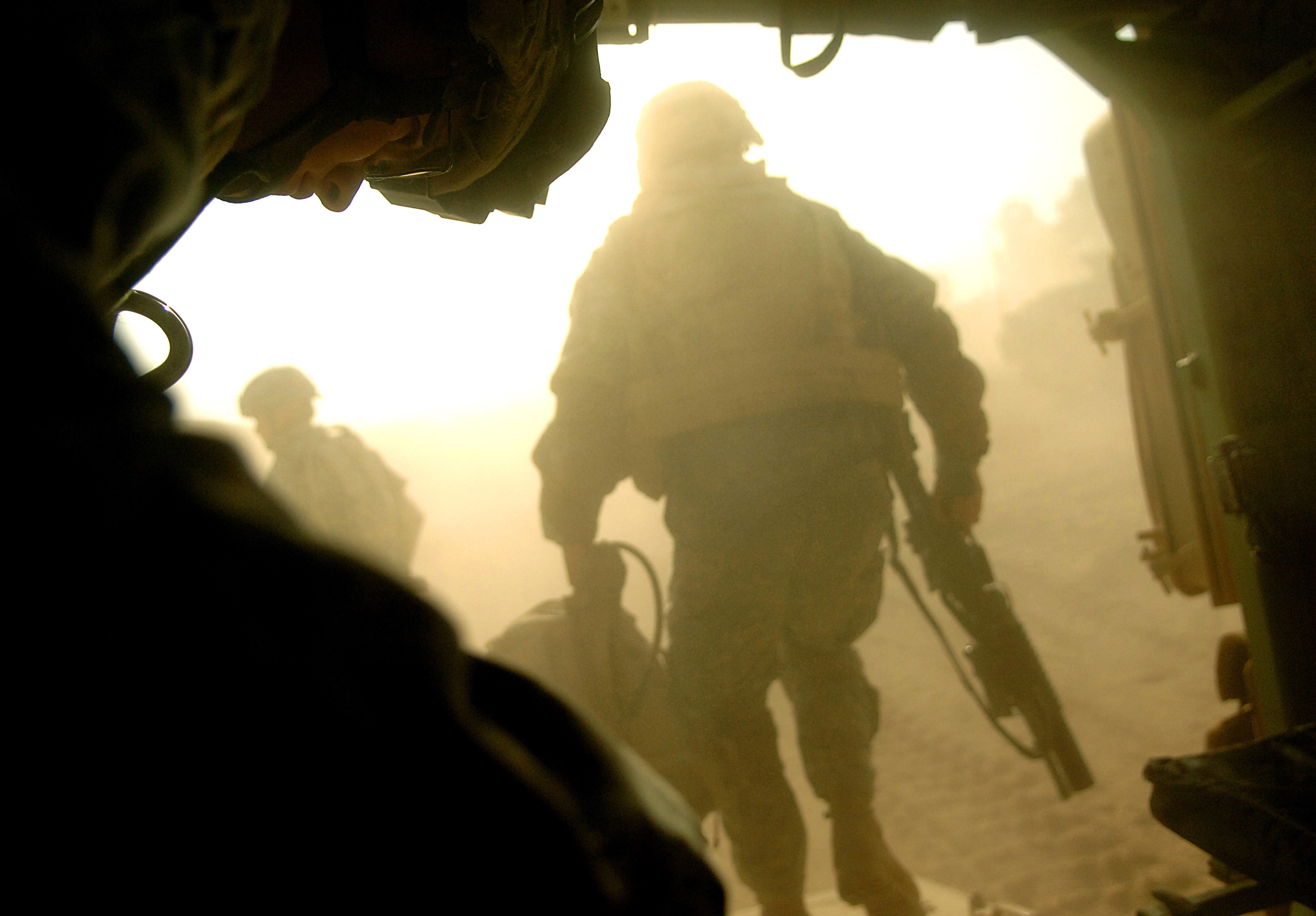
Bravo Company, 2nd Battalion, 6th Infantry Regiment, 1st Armored Division exit a M2 Bradley, following a raid in the Tameem district of Ramadi, Iraq, on Sept. 3, 2006

In early June 2006, the 1st Brigade Combat Team of the 1st Armored Division and various attachments were deployed to the Ramadi area from Tal Afar and took responsibility of the battle space from the redeploying 2nd BCT, 28th Infantry Division. Rumors of an offensive had already spread to the 400,000 citizens of the city who feared another Fallujah style attack. But the U.S. commander of 1st BCT, 1st Armored Division, Colonel Sean MacFarland decided to take it slowly and softly, without using heavy close air support, artillery or tank fire. Tanks were used to safeguard soldiers against IEDs and were key in targeting bunkered insurgents and snipers. By June 10, U.S. soldiers had "cordoned off" the city. U.S. airstrikes on residential areas were escalating, and US soldiers took to the streets with loudspeakers to warn civilians of a fierce impending attack. The concept, described by Major Matthew Van Wagenen of 1st Battalion, 37th Armor Regiment, was to "leave the city intact".

The objective of the operation was to cut off resupply and reinforcements to the insurgents in Ramadi by gaining control of the key entry points into the city. 1st BCT, 1st Armored Division also planned to establish new combat outposts (COPs) and patrol bases throughout the city, moving off their forward operating bases in order to engage the population and establish relationships with local leaders.

On June 7, through intelligence tracking, Abu Musab Al-Zarqawi was located and killed by US Forces in a precision-guided bomb strike outside of Baghdad along with five other insurgents. By June 17, there were several skirmishes with the insurgents which killed two American soldiers.

=== Ramadi General Hospital Captured ===
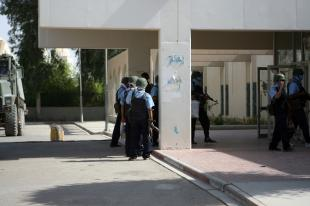
Iraqi police prepare to enter the Ramadi hospital, July 5, 2006.

At the beginning of July, units under the command of 1st BCT, 1st Armored Division and Iraqi Forces, managed to push deep enough into the city to capture the Ramadi General Hospital. The Marines reported through verified evidence that members of al-Qaeda in Iraq had been using the seven-story building, which was equipped with some 250 beds, to treat their wounded and fire on U.S. troops in the area. At the conclusion of the operation, American Forces took heavy sniper fire from insurgents that slipped away.

=== Formation of the Anbar Awakening Council ===
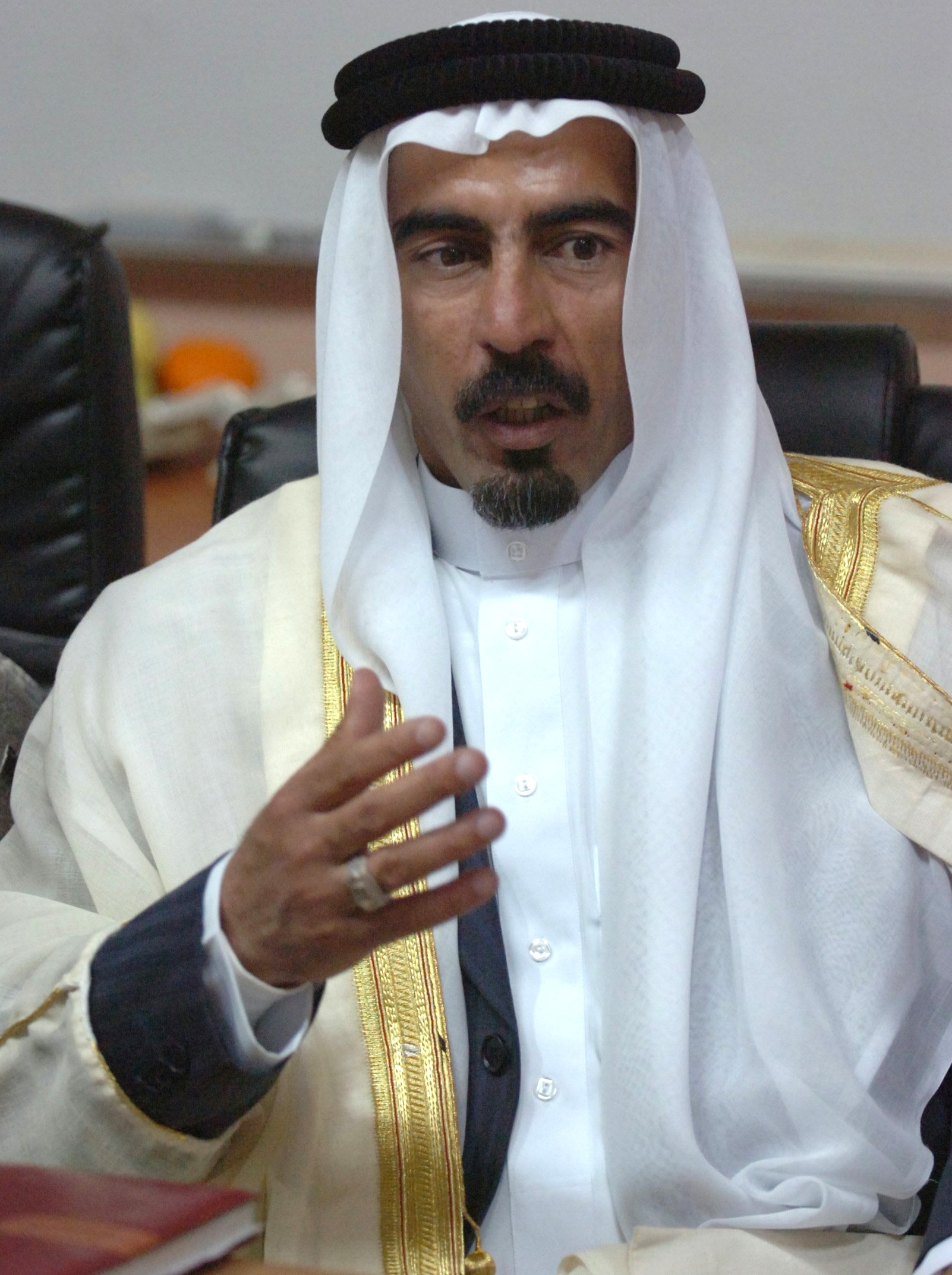
Sheikh Abdul Sittar speaks with Sen. John McCain, R-Ariz., and Lt. Gen. Ray Odierno, commander of Multi-National Corps - Iraq at Camp Ramadi, April 2, 2007. Sheikh Sittar helped spark the Anbar Awakening Movement.

On August 21, insurgents killed Abu Ali Jassim, a Sunni sheikh who had encouraged many of his tribesmen to join the Iraqi Police. The insurgents hid the body in a field rather than returning it for a proper burial, violating Islamic law and angering Jassim's tribesmen. Following this, 40 sheikhs from 20 tribes from across Al Anbar organised a movement called the Sahwa Al Anbar (Anbar Awakening). On September 9, Sheikh Sittar organised a tribal council attended by over fifty sheikhs and Col. Sean MacFarland. During this council, Sittar officially declared the Anbar Awakening underway.

Shortly after the council, the tribes began attacking al-Qaeda in Iraq insurgents in the suburbs of Ramadi. By October, nearly every tribe in northern and western Ramadi had joined the awakening. By December, attacks had dropped 50% according to the U.S. military.

=== September–October ===
In mid-September 2006, the 1st Battalion, 6th Marines ("1/6") relieved the 3rd Battalion, 8th Marines in western Ramadi. The battalion commander, Lt. Col. Jurney, deployed his companies throughout the city. Alpha Company was deployed to OP VA, a combat outpost close to a large seven-story building. Bravo Company took up position in the Ramadi Government Center and Charlie Company was deployed to OP Hawk, the main combat outpost around Ramadi General Hospital.

Delta Force operators from Task Force Green and DEVGRU operators from Task Force Blue mounted takedown operations against al-Qaeda targets based on high-level intelligence.

In late September, Pentagon officials announced that the troops of the 1st brigade, 1st Armored Division would have their tour extended by 46 days. This extension was ordered to give the relieving brigade, the 1st brigade, 3rd Infantry Division time to prepare for their deployment at the start of 2007.

In mid-October, 1/6 conducted its first major offensive, taking the large building on 17th Street in the Jumaiyah neighborhood where they established the 17th Street Security Station. This was the first joint Marine-Iraqi outpost in the city.

In mid-October, al-Qaeda announced the creation of Islamic State of Iraq (ISI), with Ramadi as its capital replacing the Mujahideen Shura Council (MSC) and its al-Qaeda in Iraq (AQI).

=== November incident ===
During heavy fighting between November 13 and November 15, U.S. forces were alleged to have killed at least 30 people, including women and children, in an airstrike in central Ramadi. Interviews by an unnamed Los Angeles Times correspondent in Ramadi supported eyewitness statements that there were civilian deaths during the fighting. Residents said the houses in an old Iraqi army officers quarters had been destroyed, including one being used as an Internet cafe. News photos showed bodies of civilians allegedly killed by coalition forces.

A Marine spokesman disputed the account, saying that an airstrike on November 14 targeted a bridge east of Ramadi and there were many insurgent casualties in the attack. He said that on the 13th and 14th, Coalition forces killed 16 suspected insurgents, who had been placing IEDs and firing mortars and RPGs, in fighting in three separate incidents in Ramadi. At least one U.S. soldier was also killed in the fighting. The spokesman did not respond to inquiries about the number of civilian deaths, but he admitted that it was often difficult for coalition forces to distinguish between insurgents and civilians and did not confirm or deny that some collateral damage may have occurred. He neither responded to inquiries made by The Times regarding the number of homes destroyed or tank rounds fired in the fighting.

== Aftermath ==
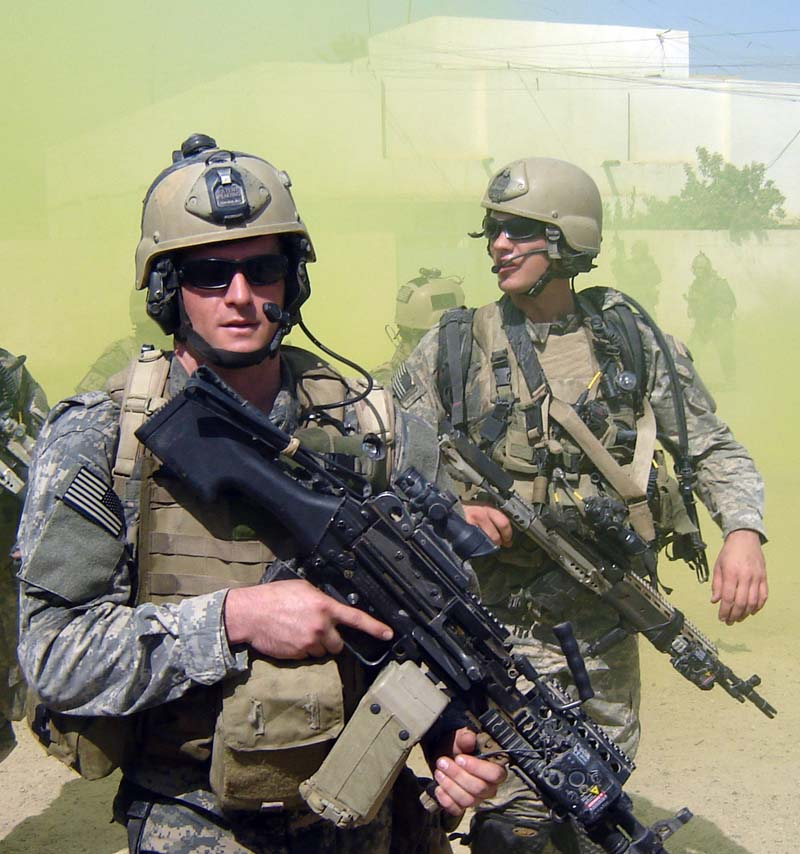
Petty Officer 2nd Class Michael Monsoor (SEAL) who was posthumously awarded the Medal of Honor for his actions during combat on Sept. 29, 2006 in Ramadi, Iraq

By mid-November at least 75 American soldiers and Marines were killed along with an unknown number of Iraqi soldiers and police. The U.S. commander, Col. MacFarland said 750 insurgents had been killed in fighting in Ramadi and that his forces had secured 70% of the city. The intense battles of October and November 2006 largely eliminated al-Qaeda from the city, the surviving militants fled, with teams of them turning up in Baghdad and elsewhere, whilst others melted into the population.

=== The Devlin report ===
Two years before the battle, in 2004, then commander of the Marine garrison, MajGen James Mattis, stated that, "if Ramadi fell the whole province (Al Anbar) goes to hell". Two years later, a classified report written by Marine Col. Pete Devlin in August 2006 and leaked to the Washington Post in mid-September 2006, said Al Anbar had been lost and there was almost nothing that could be done. Devlin was the chief Intelligence Officer for the Marine units operating in the province. The report said that not only were military operations facing a stalemate, unable to extend and sustain security beyond the perimeters of their bases, but also local governments in the province had collapsed and the weak central government had almost no presence.

On November 28, 2006, another part of the classified Marine Corps intelligence report was published by The Washington Post which said US forces could neither crush the insurgency in western Iraq nor counter the rising popularity of the al-Qaeda terrorist network in the area. According to the report, "the social and political situation has deteriorated to a point that US and Iraqi troops are no longer capable of militarily defeating the insurgency in al-Anbar." The report describes al-Qaeda in Iraq as the "dominant organization of influence" in the province, more important than local authorities, the Iraqi government and US troops "in its ability to control the day-to-day life of the average Sunni."

=== Operation Squeeze Play ===
Insurgents still remained well entrenched in the city with coalition forces continuing combat operations throughout November and December. On November 28, 2006, six civilians, including five Iraqi girls, were killed when a U.S. tank fired into a building from which two insurgents were firing upon U.S. soldiers.

On December 1, 2006, a 900-strong task force centered around the 1st Battalion, 37th Armored Regiment (1-37) launched a month-long operation known as Operation Squeeze Play targeting the "Second Officers District" in central Ramadi. On December 6, six American soldiers were killed in heavy street fighting. Three of these, two soldiers and a Marine, were killed in an area of western Ramadi controlled by the Abu Alwan tribe, which was aligned with the Awakening movement. According to Col. MacFarland, the tribe saw the killings as a personal attack by the insurgents against their tribe and killed or captured all of the insurgents involved in the attack within ten days. By the end of the operation on January 14, 2007, US forces had killed 44 insurgents and captured a further 172. Four additional Iraqi police stations were established during the operation, which brought the total to 14.

=== Marine reserve force committed ===
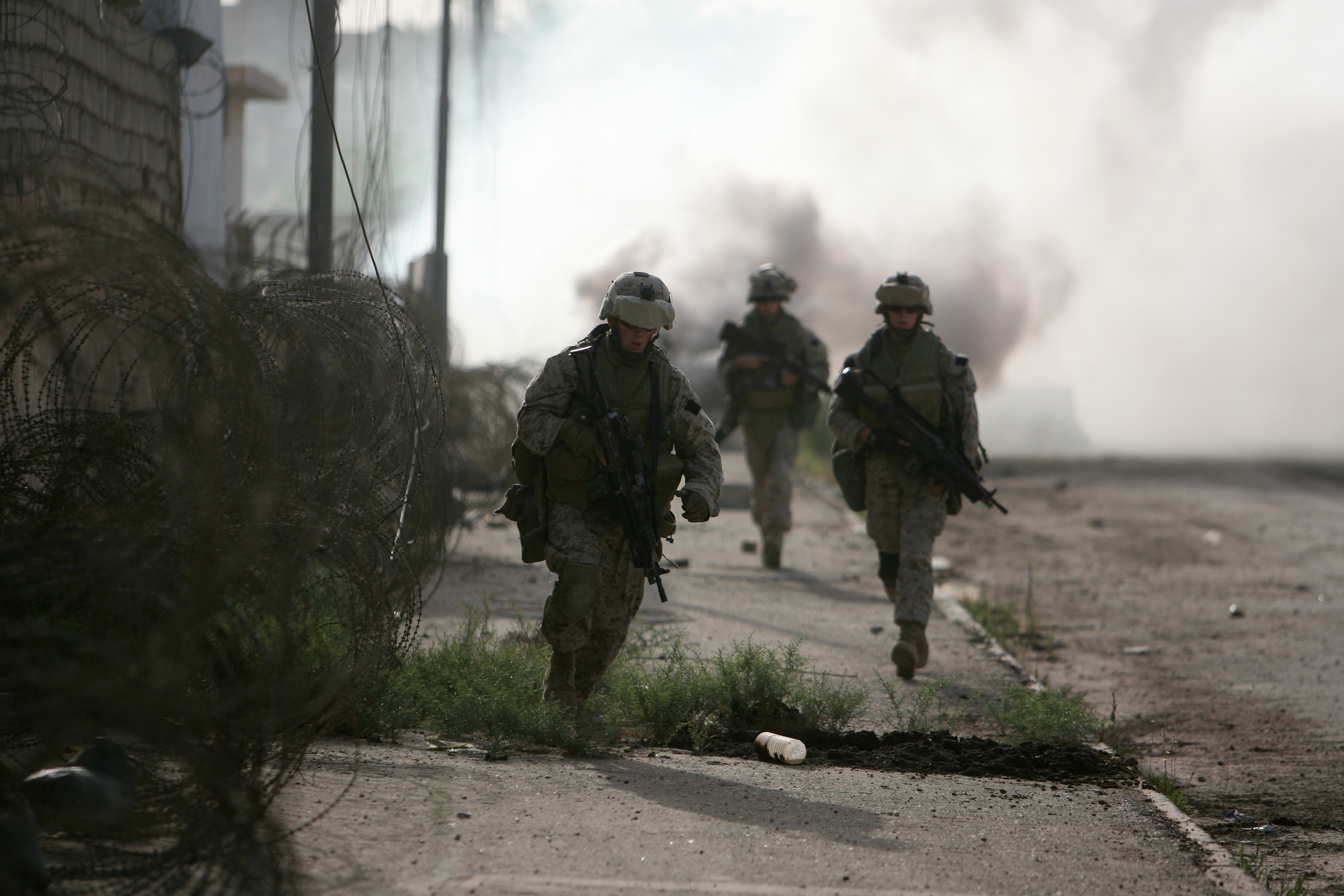
Marines prevent OPFOR Forces from staging attacks against Coalition Forces and Iraqi Security Forces in western Ramadi

In mid-November 2006, 2,200 Marines from the 15th Marine Expeditionary Unit (15th MEU), a reserve force on ships in the Persian Gulf, deployed to Al Anbar as reinforcements. This force included members of Battalion Landing Team 2nd Battalion, 4th Marine Regiment who were sent by General Abizaid to help in the fighting in Ramadi. In January 2007, as part of the U.S. troop surge in Iraq, 4,000 Marines in Al Anbar had their tour extended by 45 days. The order included the 15th MEU and 1st Battalion, 6th Marine Regiment fighting in Ramadi, as well as the 3rd Battalion, 4th Marine Regiment fighting elsewhere in Al Anbar.

=== 1-9 Infantry Regiment (Manchu): Operation Murfreesboro and East Ramadi ===
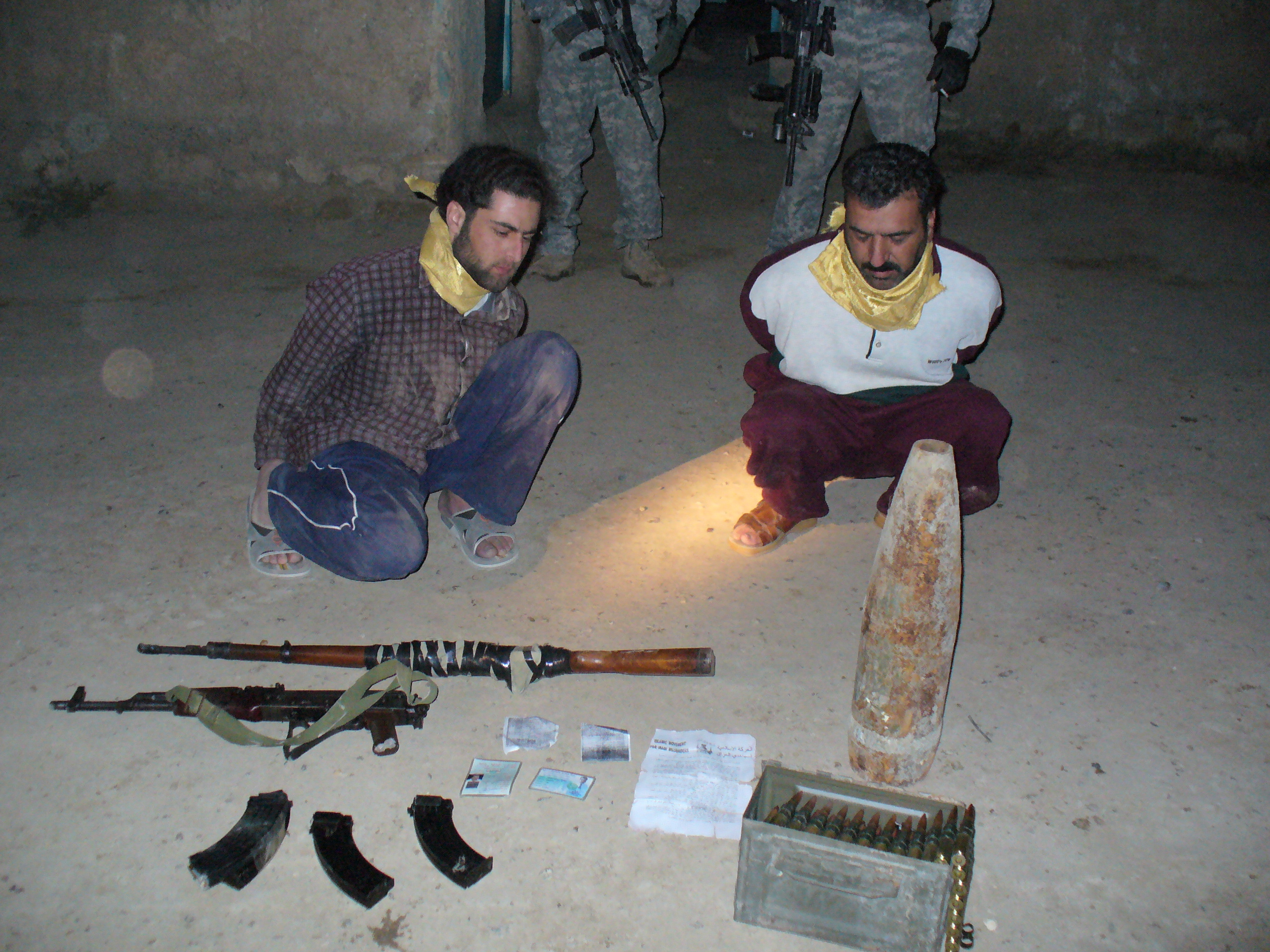
Captured insurgents

This operation was one of the closing engagements of the Second Battle of Ramadi in 2006. In the beginning months of 2007, Task Force 1–9, comprising 1st Battalion, 9th Infantry Regiment (1-9 IN, part of 2ID), with support from Abrams main battle tanks of the 3rd Battalion, 69th Armor Regiment (3-69 AR), Navy SEALS, Bradley Infantry Fighting Vehicles (IFV) and dismounted infantry from Bravo Company 1st Battalion, 26th Infantry Regiment (1-26 IN), Charlie Company of the 321st Engineer Battalion, Lima Company of 3rd Battalion, 6th Marine Regiment (3/6 Marines), and infantrymen from the veteran Iraqi Army 1st Brigade, launched an offensive in East Ramadi named Operation Murfreesboro.

The operation was intended to cut off Mal'ab District from the rest of Ramadi in order to drive out the al-Qaedah forces operating with near impunity there. The operation began February 20, 2007, when tanks and IFVs from 3-69th Armor and 1-26th Infantry set up a full cordon around Mal'ab District, preventing any movement in or out of the neighborhood. Once this was in place, the soldiers of the 1st and 9th Infantry Regiments began conducting clearing operations and targeted raids searching for weapons, improvised explosive devices (IEDs), enemy fighters, and high-level al-Qaedah leadership within Mal'ab District and the neighboring Iskaan district, supported by the aforementioned armored vehicles, Apache helicopters, and long range rockets (GMLRS).

Throughout February 2007, there were more than 40 separate engagements with al-Qaeda forces, 8 large weapons caches found, more than 20 IEDs used against US and Iraqi Army forces, more than 50 IEDs located and safely disposed of, 69 enemy fighters killed in action, 9 known enemy wounded, and 32 enemy fighters captured. Together with the Iraqi Army, the local police force began to conduct patrols with gradually lessened support from coalition forces.

Operation Murfreesboro is widely credited with breaking the back of the insurgency in Anbar Province, as it fed the fire of the Anbar Awakening, which saw almost the entirety of Anbar province turn on the insurgency, in favor of the new Iraqi government in Baghdad. Coupled with further gains in recruiting the local leaders and militias in the surrounding areas, Anbar Province required very little assistance during the famous "surge" that took place later in 2007. The improvement was so great that it enabled Task Force 1-9 (now operating without the armored and mechanized support it had enjoyed in the early part of 2007) to send nearly 70% of its strength to assist other units in clearing the city of Taji, just north of Baghdad, in October 2007.

The 1st Battalion, 9th Infantry Regiment received the Navy Unit Commendation for this battle, and was recommended for a Valorous Unit Award.

=== "Raider" Brigade takes over Ramadi ===
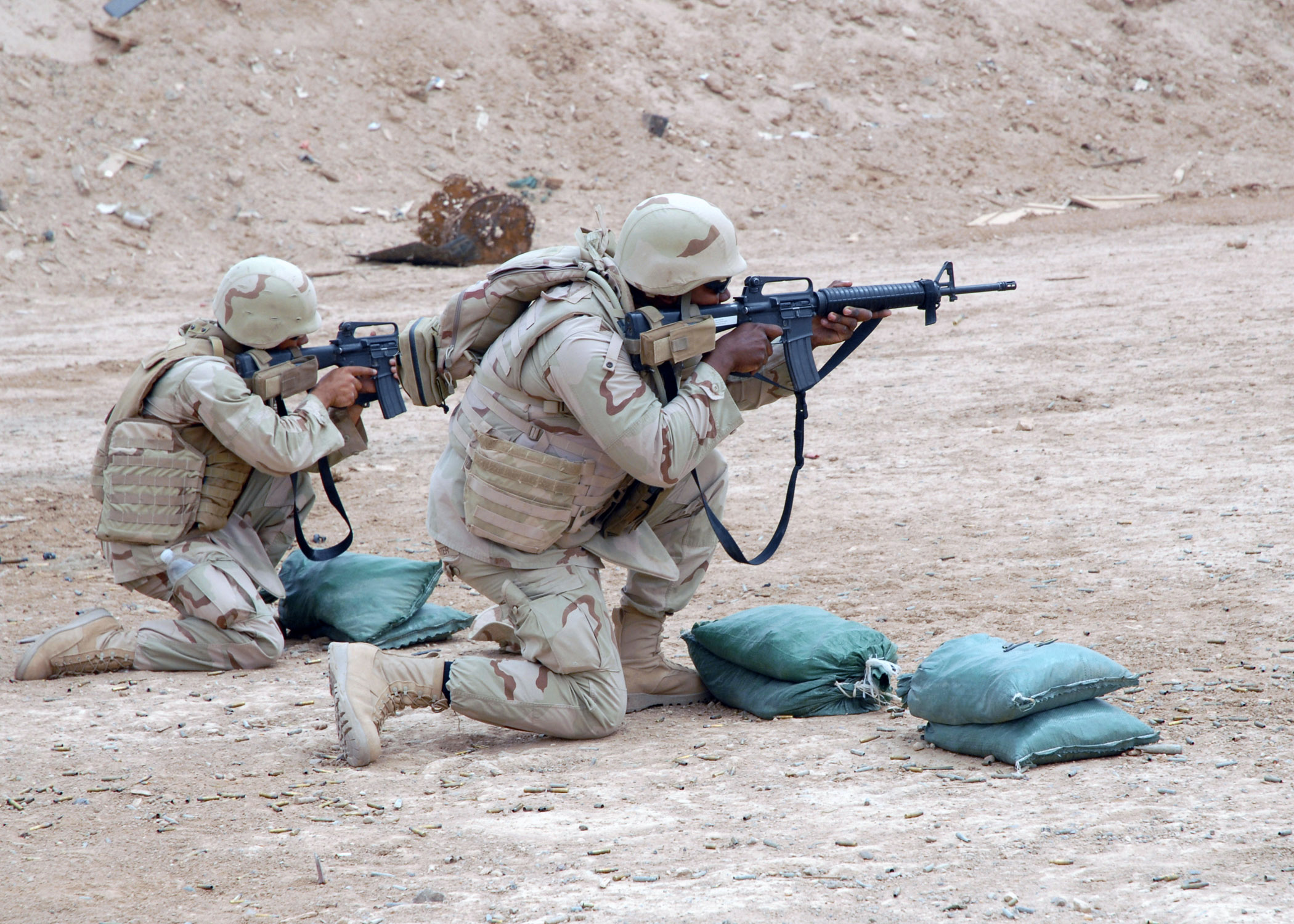
Navy Seabees deployed to Ramadi, Iraq (2007)

In January 2007, the 1st Brigade Combat Team, 3rd Infantry Division, on its third tour to Iraq, arrived in Ramadi and assumed responsibility from MacFarland's brigade on February 18 at a transfer ceremony at Camp Ramadi. During the ceremony, which was attended by Sheikh Sattar, MacFarland said that his brigade had lost 86 soldiers, sailors and Marines during the 8-month campaign (though the Brigade had spent a total of nearly 17 months in Iraq).

In January 2007, Ramadi averaged approximately 35 enemy attacks on US forces per day. Following heavy fighting over an 8-week campaign, which was led by a Task Force commanded by 1st Brigade, 3rd ID, also known as Task Force Raider, attacks in the brigade's area of operations dropped to one or two per day within the city of Ramadi. In the early months of 2007, 3-69 Armor Battalion, in conjunction with two Marine Battalions, along with TF PathFinder was largely responsible for securing Southern and Central Ramadi. By August 2007, Ramadi had gone 80 consecutive days without a single attack on US forces and the 1st BDE, 3rd ID commander, Colonel John Charlton, stated, "...al-Qaeda is defeated in Al Anbar". However, despite 1-3 ID's effectiveness, insurgents continued to launch attacks on Ramadi and the surrounding areas in the weeks and months to follow. On June 30, 2007, a group of between 50 and 60 insurgents attempting to infiltrate Ramadi were intercepted and destroyed, following a tip from Iraqi Police officers. The insurgents were intercepted by elements of the 1st Battalion, 77th Armor on 30 June 2007 and on 1 July 2007 they were destroyed by elements of Bravo company, 2nd Squad, 1st platoon, 1-18 Infantry Regiment. 1-18 operated out of the Ta'Meem district of Ramadi's western sector. North of Ramadi, elements of 3-69 Armor, whose headquarters had been moved north of Ramadi, engaged elements of al-Qaeda in Iraq who had taken refuge in rural areas north of the city. After several counter-insurgency operations, 3-69 AR Battalion and 1st Battalion 8th Marines effectively removed Al Qaeda in Iraq from the greater Anbar province. By March 2008, Ramadi, Iraq had become a vastly safer city than it had been only a year before and the number of enemy attacks in the city had fallen drastically. Years later, by mid-2012, Ramadi remained far safer than it had been since 2003.

=== Iraqi police development ===
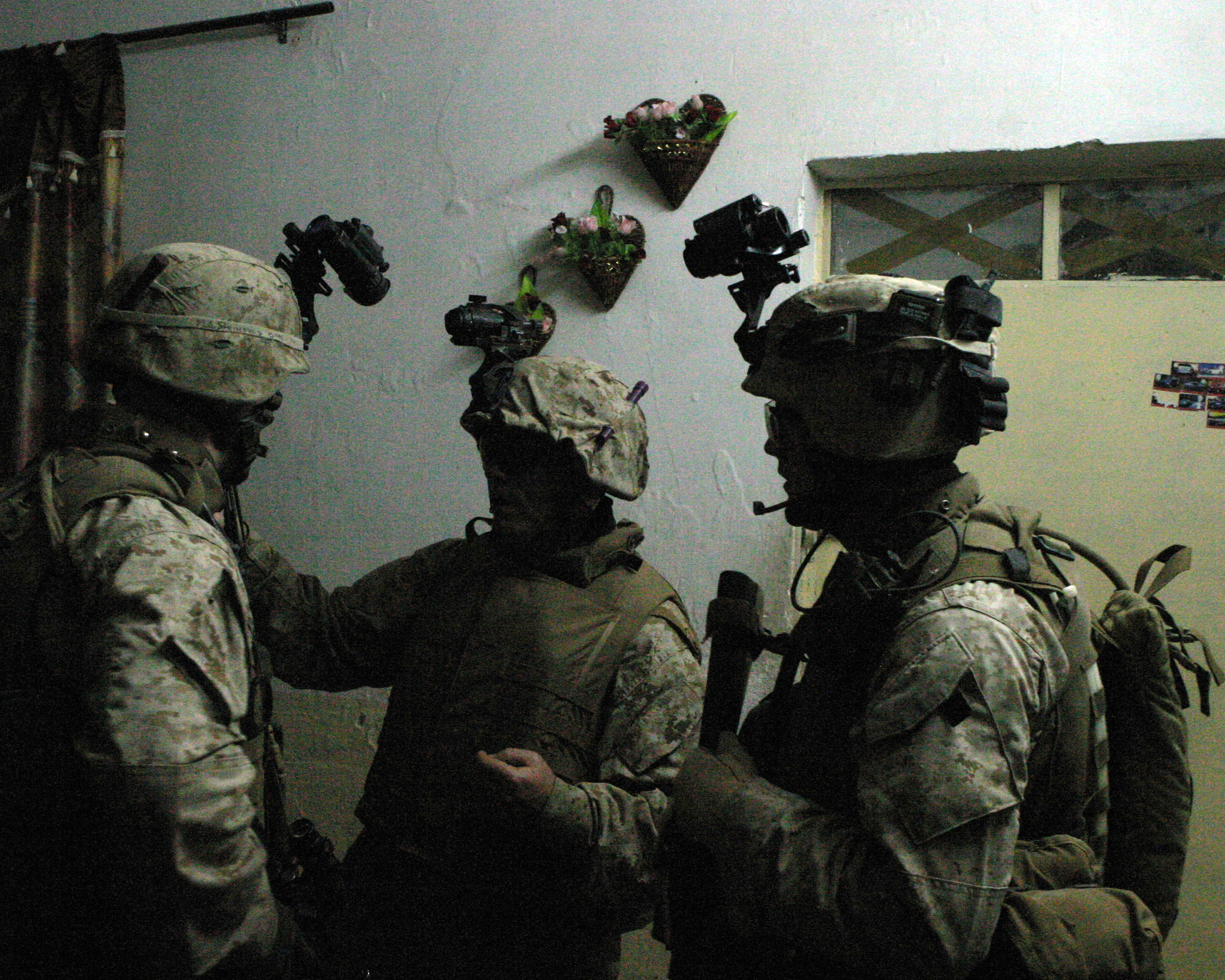
Joint Security Forces from the 7th street Security Station in Ramadi, Iraq to include Iraqi Police along with 6th Marine Battalion

One major shortcoming in the efforts to wrest control of Ramadi from the insurgency was the failure of the Iraqi Police to effectively combat the insurgency. As part of the Tribal Engagement Strategy, Ready First developed and implemented a plan to quickly recruit, train, and employ Iraqi policemen on the streets of Ramadi. COL MacFarland, and LTC James Lechner, Deputy Brigade Commander, successfully developed an Iraqi Police recruiting, training, and employment plan that was implemented by HHC, 2-152 Infantry (Mech), Team Gator as they were known lived in Iraqi police stations and Combat Outposts conducting daily patrols and major enemy clearing operations with their counterparts. HHC, 2-152 Infantry, also known in Ramadi as "the 152nd", or the Police Transition Team (PTT) Company would provide the Iraqi Police in Ramadi with the leadership and oversight that proved crucial in re-establishing a police presence in Ramadi to ensure insurgent forces did not return to neighborhoods that had been secured. Consequently, the success of the Iraqi Police program in Ramadi convinced the Ramadi populace that their government could effectively provide for their security needs, a critical element of defeating the insurgency. The 152nd PTT Company's Iraqi Police efforts began in October 2006 and would continue through the departure of Ready First and into the tenure of 1st Brigade, 3rd Infantry Division until the 152nd departed in October 2007. The 152nd was responsible for recruiting, training, and conducting patrols with hundreds of Iraqi Police, and opened several new Iraqi police stations in the city of Ramadi.

== Order of battle ==
United States Armed Forces

Joint Special Operations Command
1st Special Forces Operational Detachment-Delta
Naval Special Warfare Development Group
2nd Battalion, 75th Rangers (Echo Platoon)
2nd Battalion, 75th Rangers (Delta Platoon)
160th Special Operations Aviation Regiment (Airborne)
Naval Special Warfare Command
SEAL Team 3
SEAL Team 5
Navy EOD, (Enablers)
101st Airborne Division
1st Battalion, 506th Infantry Regiment
54th Engineer Battalion
Alpha, Bravo, and Charlie Company, route clearance and reconnaissance
1st Armored Division
1st Battalion, 6th Infantry
2nd Battalion, 6th Infantry
1st Battalion 35th Armor
1st Battalion 36th Infantry
1st Battalion 37th Armor
2nd Battalion, 37th Armor
2nd Battalion, 3rd Field Artillery
16th Engineer Battalion
Alpha Company, 40th Engineer Battalion
Charlie Company, 40th Engineer Battalion
46th Engineer Battalion
321st Engineer Battalion (Task Force Pathfinder), route clearance and horizontal construction
501st Forward Support Battalion
47th Forward Support Battalion
Asymmetric Warfare Group
HHC, 2nd Battalion, 152nd Infantry Regiment (Police Transition Team Company)
B Co, 486th Civil Affairs Battalion
415th Military Intelligence Battalion
1st Infantry Division
1st Battalion, 77th Armor
1st Battalion, 18th Infantry Regiment
1st Battalion, 26th Infantry Regiment Task Force 1-9
2nd Infantry Division
1st Battalion 9th Infantry Regiment Task Force 1-9;
2nd Brigade Combat Team, 28th Infantry Division
3rd Infantry Division
3rd Battalion, 69th Armor Regiment Task Force 1-9
I Marine Expeditionary Force
Regimental Combat Team 5

2nd Battalion, 4th Marines, 15th MEU
3rd Battalion, 5th Marines
1st Battalion, 6th Marines
3rd Battalion, 7th Marines
1st Battalion, 8th Marines
3rd Battalion, 8th Marines
2nd Battalion, 11th Marines
3rd Battalion, 11th Marines
3rd Battalion, 2nd Marines

- Headquarters 10th Marines Counter Battery Radar/ Target Acquisition Platoon

Marine Light Attack Squadron 269
2nd Air Naval Gunfire Liaison Company
1st Air Naval Gunfire Liaison Company
1st Radio Battalion

504th Military Intelligence Brigade
163rd Military Intelligence Battalion (Tactical Exploitation)
Combat Logistics Regiment 15
Civil Affairs & Psychological Operations Command (Airborne)
Department Of Defense Security Forces, Tactical Response Team
U.S. Navy Seabees
9th Naval Construction Regiment
Naval Mobile Construction Battalion 40
Naval Mobile Construction Battalion 74
Naval Beach Group One, NBP-1
Company B(-) 4th AABN USMC
U.S. Air Force 391st Fighter Squadron

United Kingdom Special Forces

(Iraq) Iraqi Army

- 1st Brigade, 1st Iraqi Army Division
- 1st Brigade, 7th Iraqi Army Division
