= Sean MacFarland =

American general

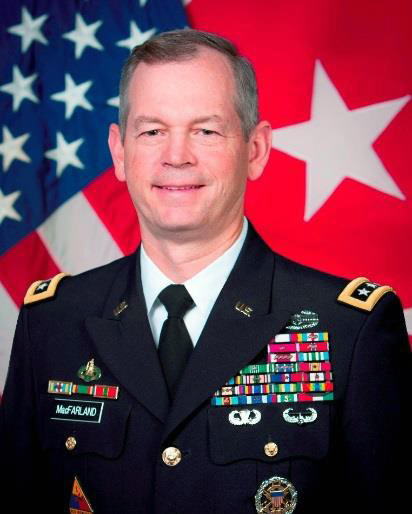
- Lieutenant General Sean MacFarland in April 2017
- Born: February 12, 1959 (age 67); Albany, New York, United States
- Military career
- Allegiance: United States of America
- Branch: United States Army
- Service years: 1981–2018
- Rank: Lieutenant General
- Commands: Deputy Commander, TRADOC; III Corps; 1st Armored Division; 1st Brigade Combat Team, 1st Armored Division; 2nd Battalion, 63rd Armor Regiment
- Conflicts: Gulf War; Iraq War: Battle of Ramadi; War in Afghanistan; Military intervention against ISIL
- Awards: Defense Distinguished Service Medal with "C" device Army Distinguished Service Medal (3); Defense Superior Service Medal (3); Legion of Merit (2); Bronze Star Medal (3); Meritorious Service Medal (5)

Sean Barry MacFarland (born February 12, 1959) is a retired three-star lieutenant general who served in the United States Army.

In 2015 MacFarland, then commanding III Corps, was selected as commander of the coalition against ISIS in Syria and Iraq. MacFarland and III Corps thus became responsible for Combined Joint Task Force – Operation Inherent Resolve (CJTF-OIR). MacFarland was selected as one of Time Magazine's 100 Most Influential People in 2016, handing over command to Lieutenant General Stephen J. Townsend and the XVIII Airborne Corps in August 2016. He became deputy commanding general and chief of staff for the United States Army Training and Doctrine Command in April 2017, and retired from active duty 27 February 2018.

== Career ==
MacFarland was commissioned into the United States Army in 1981 and has served in armor and cavalry units throughout his career. He was a cavalry platoon leader and troop executive officer in 2nd Squadron, 3rd Armored Cavalry Regiment at Ft. Bliss, Texas, the Squadron S4 and the commander of A Troop, 3rd Squadron, 12th Cavalry in Buedingen, Germany, S3 and XO of 3rd and 1st Squadrons, respectively, of the 4th Cavalry in Schweinfurt, Germany and in Bosnia. He commanded 2nd Battalion, 63rd Armor in Macedonia and Vilseck, Germany. He also commanded 1st Brigade Combat Team (Ready First), 1st Armored Division in Friedberg, Germany and in Iraq, where the Ready First fought in Tal Afar, Sinjar, Hit and Ramadi. Most recently, he was Commanding General of Fort Bliss, Texas and the 45th Commanding General of the 1st Armored Division (Old Ironsides).

Other assignments included: US Army's lead action officer for combat development of National Missile Defense interceptors at Ft. Bliss, Deputy Regimental S3 of 3rd ACR during Desert Shield/Storm, Deputy G3, 1st Infantry Division in Wuerzburg, Germany; Chief of the 3rd Army Commander's Initiative Group at Ft. McPherson, Georgia and in Kuwait during Operation Desert Thunder; Aide de Camp for the US Army Europe CG in Heidelberg and Sarajevo, Bosnia-Herzegovina; Chief of Future Operations for Combined/Joint Task Force 7 in Baghdad, Iraq; G3 of V Corps in Heidelberg, Germany; Chief of the Joint Staff J5's Iraq Division in Washington, DC; Commanding General of Joint Task Force North at Ft. Bliss, Deputy Commanding General for Leader Development and Education and the Deputy Commandant of the Command and General Staff College at Fort Leavenworth, Kansas, and was dual-hatted as Deputy Chief of Staff for Operations for the International Security Assistance Force in Afghanistan and the Deputy Commanding General for Operations for US Forces Afghanistan.

== Awards ==
MacFarland is a graduate of the United States Military Academy, the Command and General Staff College, the School of Advanced Military Studies, and the Industrial College of the Armed Forces. He also earned a Master of Science degree in Aerospace Engineering at Georgia Tech. In 2016 He was named by Time Magazine's 100 Most Influential People in the World.

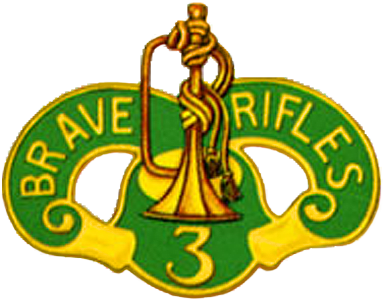
Combat Action Badge
Basic Parachutist Badge
Air Assault Badge
Joint Chiefs of Staff Identification Badge
1st Armored Division Combat Service Identification Badge
3rd Armored Cavalry Regiment Distinctive Unit Insignia
9 Overseas Service Bars

Defense Distinguished Service Medal with "C" device
Army Distinguished Service Medal with two bronze oak leaf clusters
Defense Superior Service Medal with two oak leaf clusters
Legion of Merit with oak leaf cluster
Bronze Star Medal with two oak leaf clusters
Meritorious Service Medal with four oak leaf clusters
Joint Service Commendation Medal
Army Commendation Medal with oak leaf cluster
Army Achievement Medal with four oak leaf clusters
Joint Meritorious Unit Award with two oak leaf clusters
Navy Unit Commendation
Army Superior Unit Award
National Defense Service Medal with one bronze service star
Armed Forces Expeditionary Medal
Southwest Asia Service Medal with two campaign stars
Kosovo Campaign Medal with campaign star
Afghanistan Campaign Medal with campaign star
Iraq Campaign Medal with three campaign stars
Global War on Terrorism Expeditionary Medal
Global War on Terrorism Service Medal
Armed Forces Service Medal
Army Service Ribbon
Army Overseas Service Ribbon with bronze award numeral 4
NATO Medal for Service with ISAF
Kuwait Liberation Medal (Saudi Arabia)
Kuwait Liberation Medal (Kuwait)

== Commands ==
He commanded 1st Brigade Combat Team, 1st Armored Division during the Iraq War and the Battle of Ramadi in 2006. He is the former Deputy Chief of Staff for Operations for the International Security Assistance Force in Afghanistan. MacFarland was previously the Commanding General of Fort Bliss and the 1st Armored Division, and the Commanding General of III Corps at Fort Hood.

Military offices
Preceded by Dana J.H. Pittard	Commanding General, 1st Armored Division; 2013–2014	Succeeded by Stephen Twitty
Preceded by Mark A. Milley	Commanding General, III Corps; 2015–2017	Succeeded by Paul E. Funk II
Preceded by James L. Terry	Commanding General, Combined Joint Task Force - Operation Inherent Resolve; 2015–2016	Succeeded by Stephen J. Townsend
Preceded by Kevin W. Mangum	Deputy Commanding General and Chief of Staff, United States Army Training and Doctrine Command; 2017-2018	Succeeded by Theodore D. Martin
