= Ramadi Barrage =

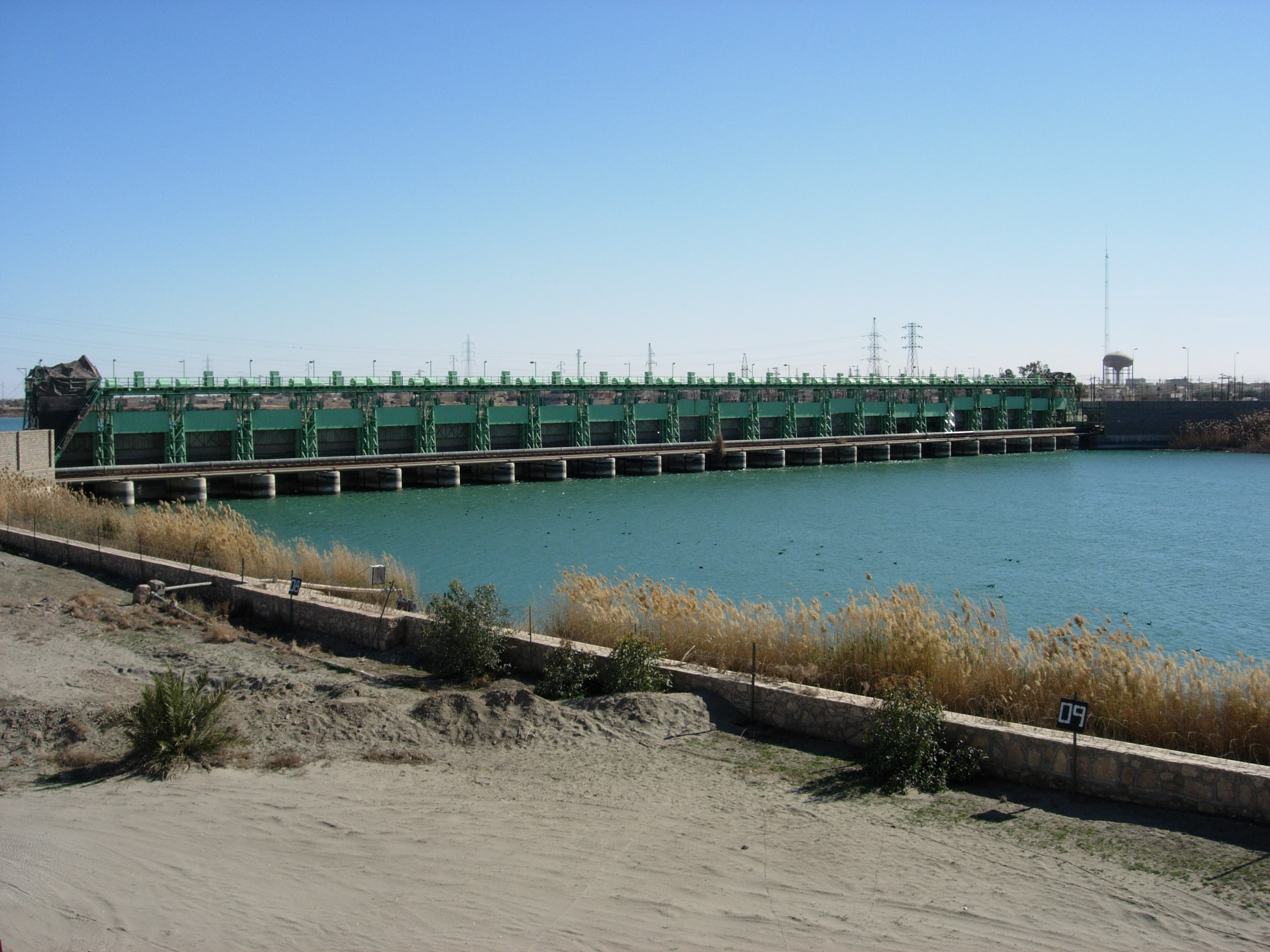
- Upstream face of southern barrage, facing southeast

- Location within Iraq
- Location: Directly west of Ramadi, Al Anbar Governorate, Iraq
- Coordinates: 33°26′04″N 43°15′55″E
- Opening date: 1955
- Operator: Ministry of Water Resources

Dam and spillways
- Impounds: Euphrates River

Ramadi Barrage is a two-section diversion dam on the Euphrates River adjacent (west) of Ramadi, Iraq. The main purpose of the northern barrage is to slow or stop water if needed, allowing it to be diverted through the southern barrage into a canal. The canal feeds water into Lake Habbaniyah to the southeast.

The intent was to use water stored by the Ramadi Barrage and the Samarra Barrage for irrigation. However, evaporation on Lakes Habbaniyah and Tharthar led to reduced storage and high salinity, conditions unsuitable for irrigation.
