= Samarra Barrage =

Samarra Dam
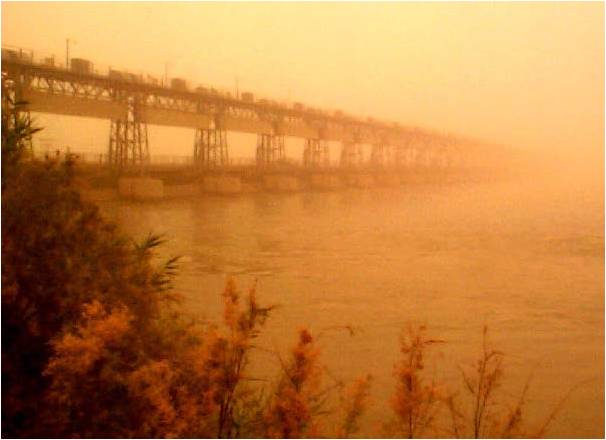

- Location within Iraq
- Location: Directly east of Samarra, Salah ad Din Governorate, Iraq
- Coordinates: 34°11′45″N 43°51′02″E
- Opening date: 1956
- Operator: Ministry of Water Resources

Dam and spillways
- Impounds: Tigris River
- Elevation at crest: Approx. 65 m (213 ft)
- Spillway capacity: Samarra Barrage: 7,000 m^{3}/s (247,203 cu ft/s); Tharthar Regulator: 9,000 m^{3}/s (317,832 cu ft/s)

Reservoir
- Total capacity: 150,000,000 m^{3} (121,607 acre⋅ft)

Power Station
- Commission date: 1972
- Type: Run-of-the-river
- Turbines: 3 x 28 MW Kaplan-type
- Installed capacity: 84 MW

The Samarra Barrage (Arabic: سد سامَرّاء) is a multi-purpose barrage on the Tigris River adjacent (west) of Samarra and north of Baghdad, Iraq. The main purpose of the dam is to divert floodwater in the Tigris River to Lake Tharthar through the Tharthar depression along with irrigation and an 84 MW hydro-electricity station. It also serves to produce hydroelectric power and flood control – although the latter has become less critical with the construction of the Mosul Dam upstream and several other large dams in Turkey.

It was completed in 1956 by the German company Züblin. Designs were completed by the British firm Voganlei and Coode. The power station was commissioned in 1972. The Samarra Barrage portion of the structure has 17 gates capable of passing 7,000 m^{3}/s (247,203 cu ft/s) of water to the Tigris while the Tharthar regulator can divert up to 9,000 m^{3}/s (317,832 cu ft/s) into a canal with 36 gates. The reservoir's design capacity is 150,000,000 m^{3} (121,607 acre⋅ft) but much of that is filled with sediment.

The intent was to use water stored from the Samarra Barrage and the Ramadi Barrage for irrigation. However, evaporation on Lakes Habbaniyah and Tharthar lead to reduced storage and high salinity, conditions unsuitable for irrigation.
