= 3rd Battalion, 69th Armor Regiment =

United States Army combined arms battalion

3–69 Armor Battalion
- Distinctive Unit Insignia
- Active: 15 July 1940 – Present
- Country: United States
- Branch: Regular Army
- Type: Combined Arms Battalion
- Role: Task Force
- Garrison/HQ: Fort Stewart, GA
- Nicknames: Speed and Power
- Mottos: VITESSE ET PUISSANCE (Speed and Power)
- Colors: Green, White and Black
- Engagements: World War II; Gulf War; Kosovo; Operation Iraqi Freedom (I, III, V, VII); Operation New Dawn; Operation Enduring Freedom

Commanders
- Current commander: LTC Walter Biner

The 3rd Battalion, 69th Armor Regiment (3–69 AR) is a United States Army combined arms battalion and part of the 3rd Infantry Division based at Fort Stewart, Georgia. 3–69 AR was the first conventional US unit to enter Iraq in 2003, and among the first units to serve four tours in Iraq. Throughout Operation Iraqi Freedom 3–69 AR was featured several times on CNN, ABC News, and the PBS documentary Back to the Front detailing the deployment of Sgt Michael Murphy. The unit was first made famous for taking the Baghdad International Airport in 2003.

== WWII ==
3rd Battalion, 69th Armor Regiment, was originally constituted on 15 July 1940 in the Regular Army as Company C, 69th Armored Regiment, an element of the 1st Armored Division. It activated on 31 July 1940 at Fort Knox, KY, and inactivated there on 10 January 1942.

It reactivated on 15 February 1942 at Fort Knox, KY, (the 69th Armored Regiment was concurrently relieved from assignment to the 1st Armored Division and assigned to the 6th Armored Division). It was reorganized and re-designated on 20 September 1943 as Company C, 69th Tank Battalion. It was eventually absorbed on 10 July 1945 by the 69th Amphibian Tractor Battalion (the 69th Amphibian Tractor Battalion was concurrently relieved from assignment to the 6th Armored Division). It inactivated on 8 March 1946 at Camp Kilmer, NJ.

== Cold War ==
The former Company C, 69th Tank Battalion, was reconstituted on 21 August 1950 in the Regular Army as Company C, 69th Medium Tank Battalion, an element of the 6th Armored Division. It activated on 5 September 1950 at Fort Leonard Wood, Missouri. It inactivated there on 16 March 1956.

It was re-designated on 14 January 1957 as Company C, 69th Tank Battalion (the 69th Medium Tank Battalion was relieved on 1 February 1957 from assignment to the 6th Armored Division), and on 15 February 1957 as Headquarters and Headquarters Company, 3rd Medium Tank Battalion, 69th Armor. It was concurrently reassigned to the 25th Infantry Division, and activated to Hawaii (its organic elements concurrently constituted and activated). It inactivated on 1 July 1963 in Hawaii and relieved from assignment to the 25th Infantry Division.

Re-designated on 15 August 1983 as Headquarters and Headquarters Company, 3d Battalion, 69th Armor, the unit was assigned to the 3rd Infantry Division, and activated in Germany. It inactivated on 16 April 1986 in Germany and was relieved from its assignment in the 3rd Infantry Division.

The unit was reassigned on 16 October 1987 to the 24th Infantry Division and activated at Fort Stewart, Georgia. With the inactivation of the 24th ID, and the activation of the 3rd ID at Fort Stewart, the unit was reassigned once more, becoming part of the 3rd Infantry Division, based still at Fort Stewart, Georgia.

== 1990s ==
Throughout the 1990s, the battalion deployed in support of numerous war-time missions including Operations Desert Shield and Desert Storm in Iraq. It participated in the Battle for Jalibah Airfield. The battalion also participated in Intrinsic Action in Kuwait and Kosovo Force Operation support in Kosovo.

== Global War on Terrorism service ==
In March 2003 the battalion, under the command of LTC Ernest P. "Rock" Marcone, deployed for Operation Iraqi Freedom I, where it served as the "Point of the Spear" for the 3rd Infantry Division, participating in many 1BCT battles, to include the seizure of Baghdad International Airport.

In January 2005, the Speed and Power Battalion deployed again under the command of LTC Mark Wald in support of Operation Iraqi Freedom III. The battalion was based primarily at FOB Brassfield-Mora, Patrol Base Uvanni, and Patrol Base Olsen. This time the battalion served as the 1st Brigade Combat Team's and 42nd Infantry Division's main effort in Samarra, Iraq. After a successful tour, Task Force 3–69 AR redeployed to Fort Stewart in January 2006.

In January 2007, 3rd Battalion 69th Armor Regiment deployed with the 1st Brigade Combat Team, 3rd Infantry Division to Operation Iraqi Freedom V. The battalion was initially tasked with securing the volatile city of Ramadi, appropriately dubbed by intelligence personnel as the "most dangerous city in the world." Additionally, the unit was tasked with forming ties with local Sunni Sheiks, including the martyred Sheik Abdul Sattar Abu Risha. The battalion continued its second half of the deployment north of Ramadi, and executed numerous expeditionary combat operations near Lake Tharthar, Habbaniyah, and the southern region of the Salah ad Din Province. This fifteen-month deployment was part of the General Petraeus "surge" of force. After a successful tour, Task Force 3–69 Armor redeployed to Fort Stewart, Georgia in March 2008, to train in preparation of future operations.

Soldiers from Task Force 3–69 deployed in December 2009 in support of OIF VII to northeast Baghdad as the main effort of the 1st Heavy Brigade Combat Team-Augmented. The battalion assumed responsibility for an area of operations once belonging to two battalions and a brigade headquarters. The mission of enabling security and protecting the people of Iraq was accomplished through advising and assisting the Iraqi Security Forces as well as transitioning the overall responsibility for the security of Iraq from US forces to the Iraqi government. Following a successful transition into Operation New Dawn, Task Force 3–69 redeployed in December 2010.

== Notoriety ==
Bradley Fighting Vehicles attached to 3–69 AR from A co. 2-7 Infantry's third platoon were the first regular army elements to cross the berm into Iraq during Operation Iraqi Freedom I. The battalion was tasked with taking the Baghdad International Airport. When the campaign started, 3–69 AR led the rest of 3ID on the drive to Baghdad. After helping destroy the Iraqi 11th Infantry Division at Nasiriyah, 3ID turned north-west, covering unprecedented distance rapidly. It was temporarily stopped south of the Karbala Gap due to intense sandstorms and a need to wait for logistical support. Once the weather improved, the division resumed its advance, clearing the gap and turning north-east towards Baghdad. Tanks from 1st Platoon, A Company, 3–69 AR entered the Baghdad International Airport (BIAP)shortly after midnight on 4 April and 3–69 AR captured (BIAP)later that day, after limited resistance from elements of the Hammurabi Division of the Republican Guard.

== Video game reference ==
Joint Task Force by Sierra Entertainment features an M1A1 Abrams from Bravo Company 3–69 AR BN on the cover of the box and on all tanks in game. The bumper number reads "B31", as in Bravo Company, 3rd Platoon, 1 track (platoon leader's tank).

Tactical strategy Combat Mission Black Sea features 3–69 AR BN in one of its campaigns.

Online FPS game Enlisted features 3–69 AR as an unlockable 'squad'.

== Battalion Commanders ==
- LTC Jerry D. Malcolm 1983–1985
- LTC Lee A. Harmon 1986-1987
- LTC Bill Kennedy, 1988–1990
- LTC Terry Stanger, 1990–1992
- LTC Keith C. Walker, May 1992 – May 1994
- LTC John R. Bartley 1994–1996
- LTC Michael L. Altomare 1996–1998
- LTC Daniel L. Zajac, 1998–2000
- LTC David Bishop, 2000–2002
- LTC Ernest P. "Rock" Marcone, 2002 – 2004
- LTC Mark Wald, 2004–2006
- LTC Michael E. Silverman, 2006–2008
- LTC Jessie L. Robinson, 27 July 2008 – October 2009
- LTC Jeff Denius, October 2009 – October 2011
- LTC Orestees "Bo" T. Davenport, October 2011 – October 2013
- LTC Harry "Zan" Hornbuckle III, October 2013 – July 2015
- LTC Johnny A. Evans Jr., July 2015 – May 2017
- LTC William F. Coryell, May 2017 – May 2019
- LTC Andrew E. Lembke, 2019 – 2021
- LTC Stoney Portis, 2021 – May 2023
- LTC James Braudis, May 2023 – April 2025
- LTC Walter Biner, April 2025 – Present

== See also ==
- Thunder Run: The Armored Strike to Capture Baghdad
