= Ramadi =

Ramadi ٱلرَّمَادِي
- City
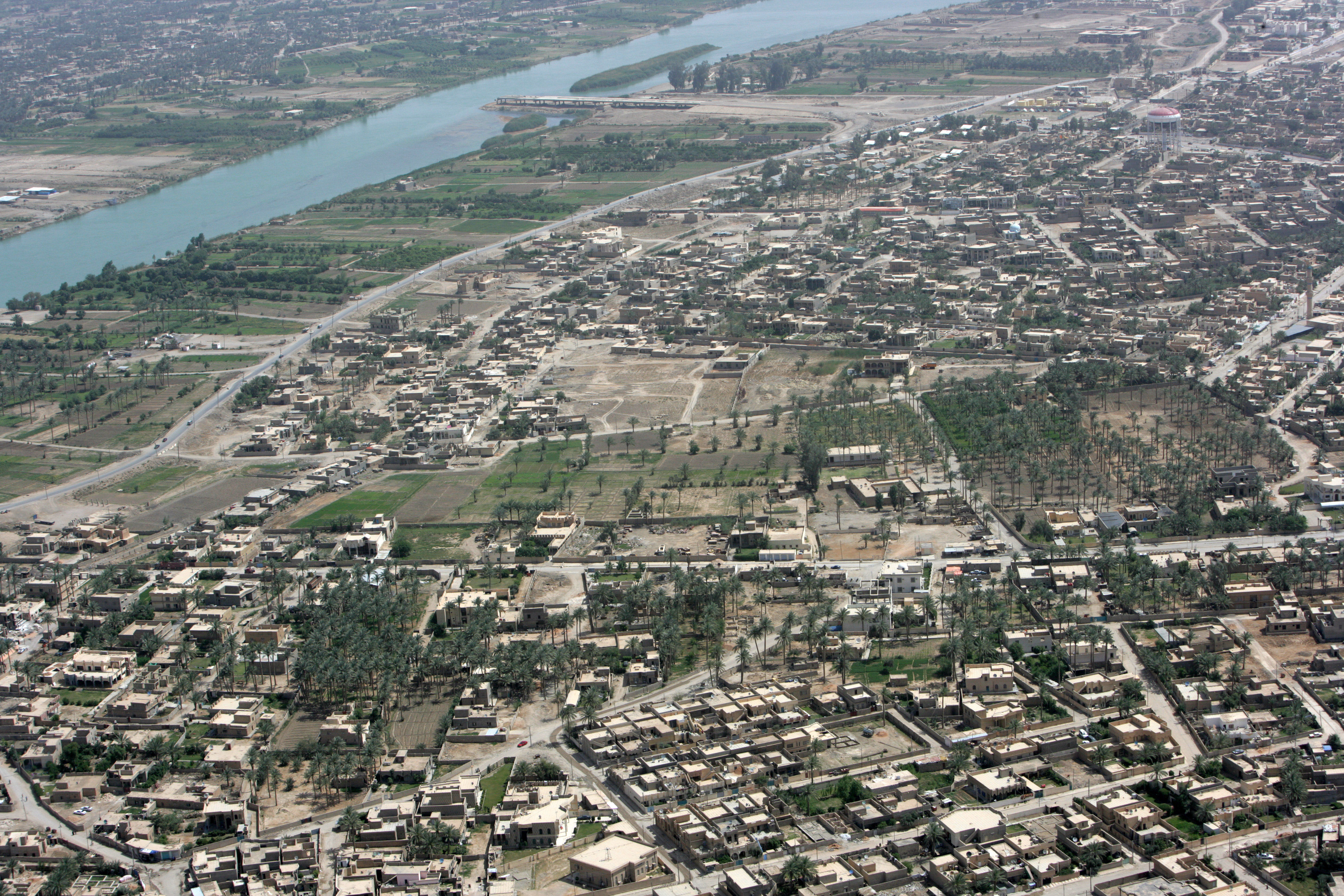

- Location within Iraq
- Coordinates: 33°25′33″N 43°17′57″E
- Country: Iraq
- Governorate: Al Anbar Governorate

Government
  - Mayor: Ibrahim Al-Awsaj
- Elevation: 160 ft (50 m)

Population (2018)
  - Total: 223,500
- Time zone: UTC+03:00 (AST)
- Postal code: 31001

Ramadi (Arabic: ٱلرَّمَادِي Ar-Ramādī; IPA: [r.ra.maː.diː]; also formerly rendered as Rumadiyah or Rumadiya) is a city in central Iraq, about 110 kilometers (68 mi) west of Baghdad and 50 kilometers (31 mi) west of Fallujah. It is the capital and largest city of Al Anbar Governorate which shares borders with Syria, Jordan, and Saudi Arabia. The city extends along the Euphrates which bisects Al Anbar. Founded in 1879, it was one of the towns established during the later period of Ottoman Iraq. By 2018 it had about 223,500 residents, near all of whom Sunni Arabs from the Dulaim tribal confederation. It lies in the Sunni Triangle of western Iraq. It is the most commonly proposed city to be the capital of a Sunni federal region in West Iraq.

Ramadi occupies a highly strategic site on the Euphrates and the road west into Syria and Jordan. This has made it a hub for trade and traffic, from which the city gained significant prosperity. Its position has meant that it has been fought over several times, during the two World Wars and again during the Iraq War and Iraqi insurgency. It was heavily damaged during the Iraq War, when it was a major focus for the insurgency against occupying United States forces. Following the withdrawal of US forces from Iraq in 2011, the city was contested by the Iraqi government and the extremist group Islamic State of Iraq and the Levant (ISIL) and fell to ISIL in May 2015. On 28 December 2015, the Iraqi government declared, confirming media testimonies, that it had re-taken Ramadi, that government's first major military victory since its loss.

== Population and demography ==
Ramadi's population was reported by the World Food Programme to number 375,000 people in 2011, though the number is likely to have decreased since then given the impact of the Iraq war and insurgency. Its population grew rapidly during the last half of the 20th century, from 12,020 people in 1956 to 192,556 in 1987. The population is very homogeneous, over 90 per cent Sunni Arab. The vast majority of its population come from the Dulaim tribal confederation, which inhabits Syria and Jordan as well as Iraq and has over a thousand individual clans, each headed by a sheik selected by tribal elders.

== History ==
Ramadi is located in a fertile, irrigated, alluvial plain, within Iraq's Sunni Triangle. A settlement already existed in the area when the British explorer Francis Rawdon Chesney passed through in 1836 on a steam-powered boat during an expedition to test the navigability of the Euphrates. He described it as a "pretty little town" and noted that the black tents of the Bedouin could be seen along both banks of the river all the way from Ramadi to Fallujah. The modern city was founded in 1869 by Midhat Pasha, the Ottoman Wali (Governor) of Baghdad. The Ottomans sought to control the previously nomadic Dulaim tribe in the region as part of a programme of settling the Bedouin tribes of Iraq through the use of land grants, in the belief that this would bind them more closely to the state and make them easier to control.

Ramadi was described in 1892 as "the most wide awake town in the whole Euphrates valley. It has a telegraph office and large government barracks. The bazaars are very large and well filled." Sir John Bagot Glubb ("Glubb Pasha") was posted there in 1922 "to maintain a rickety floating bridge over the river [Euphrates], carried on boats made of reeds daubed with bitumen", as he put it. By this time the Dulaim were mostly settled, though they had not yet fully adopted an urbanised lifestyle. Glubb described them as "cultivators along the banks of the Euphrates, watering their wheat, barley and date palms by kerids, or water lifts worked by horses. Yet they had but recently settled, and still lived in black goat-hair tents." A British military handbook published during World War I noted that "some European travellers have found the inhabitants of Rumadiyah [Ramadi] inclined to religious fanaticism".

=== World Wars I and II ===
Ramadi was twice fought over during the Mesopotamian Campaign of World War I. It was held initially by the forces of the Ottoman Empire, which garrisoned it in March 1917 after losing control of Fallujah to the east. The British Army's Lieutenant General Frederick Stanley Maude sought to drive out the garrison in July 1917 but faced severe difficulties due to exceptional heat during both day and night. A force of around 600 British soldiers plus cavalry units faced 1,000 Turks with six artillery pieces. The attack was a costly failure and a combination of exhaustion, disorganisation, Turkish artillery fire and an unexpected sandstorm forced Maude to call off the attack with heavy losses. More than half of the 566 British casualties were caused by the heat.

Maude tried again during a cooler period in September 1917. This time the attacking force, led by Major General H.T. Brookings, was better organised and the British force was able to cope with the temperatures. The British mounted their attack from a direction that the Turks had not expected and managed to cut off their enemy's line of retreat. Many members of the Turkish garrison were killed or forced to surrender and the British were able to take control of Ramadi.

Ramadi was contested again during World War II following the 1941 Iraqi coup d'état. The coup leader, Rashid Ali al-Gaylani, initiated a siege of the British base at RAF Habbaniya near Ramadi. This prompted a British counter-attack to break the siege, sparking the brief Anglo-Iraqi War. An Iraqi brigade occupied Ramadi under the auspices of a training exercise. The British assembled an ad hoc relief force dubbed Habforce which advanced from the British Mandate of Palestine into Iraq. The force succeeded in relieving RAF Habbaniya and Iraqi resistance rapidly crumbled as their counter-attacks were defeated, allowing a British column to seize control of Ramadi.

=== Post-war ===
The Ramadi Barrage was built near the city in 1955 to feed water into Lake Habbaniyah to the southeast. The University of Anbar was founded there in 1987 and, together with Ramadi's trade and transport links, gave the city a more cosmopolitan, liberal and secular culture than others in the Sunni Triangle. Many high-ranking officials of the ruling Ba'ath Party came from Ramadi. Its local elites were also closely tied to the regime. The Anbar tribes in and around the city were largely co-opted to support the regime and Ramadi was the home base of the Iraqi Army's combat engineers, special forces and many active and retired senior officers.

Ramadi was the scene of large-scale demonstrations against Saddam Hussein in 1995. This made it virtually unique in Sunni Iraq, where support for Saddam was strongest. The demonstrations were prompted by Saddam's execution of a prominent member of the Dulaim tribe from Ramadi, Iraqi Air Force General Muhammad Madhlum al-Dulaimi, and three other Dulaimi officers. The four had criticized the regime and Saddam's notoriously violent and dissolute son Uday. After their execution, the bodies were sent back to Ramadi. The regime's security forces put down the demonstrations which ensued and Saddam subsequently viewed the Dulaimis with suspicion, though he was unable to purge them without risking a full-scale tribal revolt.

=== U.S. invasion and Iraqi insurgency ===
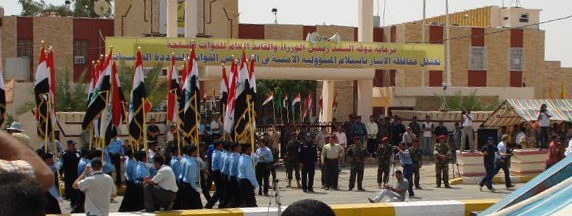
Iraqi police review in front of the government headquarters in Ramadi, 2007

The policy of de-Ba'athification and the disbandment of the Iraqi Army, implemented by the United States following the 2003 invasion of Iraq, hit Ramadi particularly hard because of its links to the party and the army. Many senior officials and military figures in the city suddenly found themselves excluded from public life. This gave them both the motivation and the means, given their connections and technical expertise, to mount a campaign of violence against coalition forces. As a result, Ramadi became a hotbed of insurgency between 2003 and 2006 and was badly affected by the Iraq War especially during the 2006 Battle of Ramadi.

=== ISIS (Islamic State of Iraq and al-Sham) ===
Following the withdrawal of US and Coalition forces in 2011, Ramadi was contested by Iraq and the Islamic State of Iraq (ISI) during the ongoing Iraqi insurgency. On 15 May 2015 Ramadi was captured by the Islamic State of Iraq and the Levant (ISIL) after a wave of assaults which included suicide car bombs, mortars, and rocket launchers. CNN reported that ISIL took over 50 high-level security personnel prisoners during the assault. The ISIL flag was also raised at the Ramadi government headquarters. By 17 May 2015 Ramadi had been completely captured by ISIL forces.

Since the ISIL occupation of Ramadi, efforts have been made to re-take the city. In November 2015, Iraqi government forces completed an encirclement of Ramadi. On 28 December, Iraqi forces advanced into the centre of the city of Ramadi and liberated it.

=== Iraq's recapture of the city ===
On 28 December 2015, Iraq's government claimed that it retook the city from the militant group ISIL. The operation started in early November. The city's recapture is seen as a major reversal for ISIL. ISIL occupied the city beginning in May 2015. The ISIL occupation of the city was a major defeat for the Iraqi government forces. The recapture of Ramadi was backed by US-led coalition air strikes and an Iraqi advance into the city, but made slow progress, mainly due to stiff resistance from ISIL militants inside the southern half of the city and also because the government chose not to use the powerful Shia-dominated paramilitary force PMF that had previously helped it regain the mainly Sunni northern city of Tikrit, to avoid increasing sectarian tensions. The military said remaining ISIL militants have headed out to the north-east of Ramadi. The PM of Iraq declared that 30 December as celebrations of the recapture of Ramadi. However, Ramadi was highly damaged afterwards, with some estimates as high as 90% of the city being destroyed during the fighting.

== Transportation ==
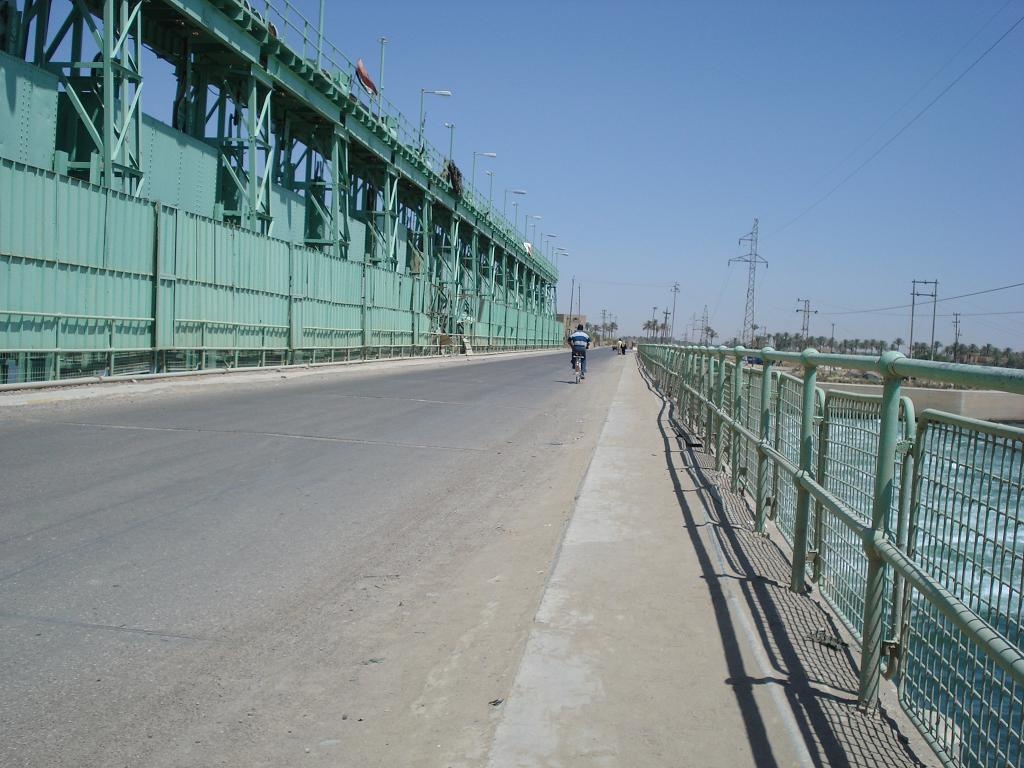
Ramadi dam, known as Al Jazeera bridge

Ramadi stands on an important trade route leading across the desert to Jordan and the Mediterranean Sea. The main Amman–Baghdad road passes through the city. A railway line also runs through the southern outskirts of Ramadi, heading east to Baghdad and west to Haditha and the Syrian border.

== Geography ==
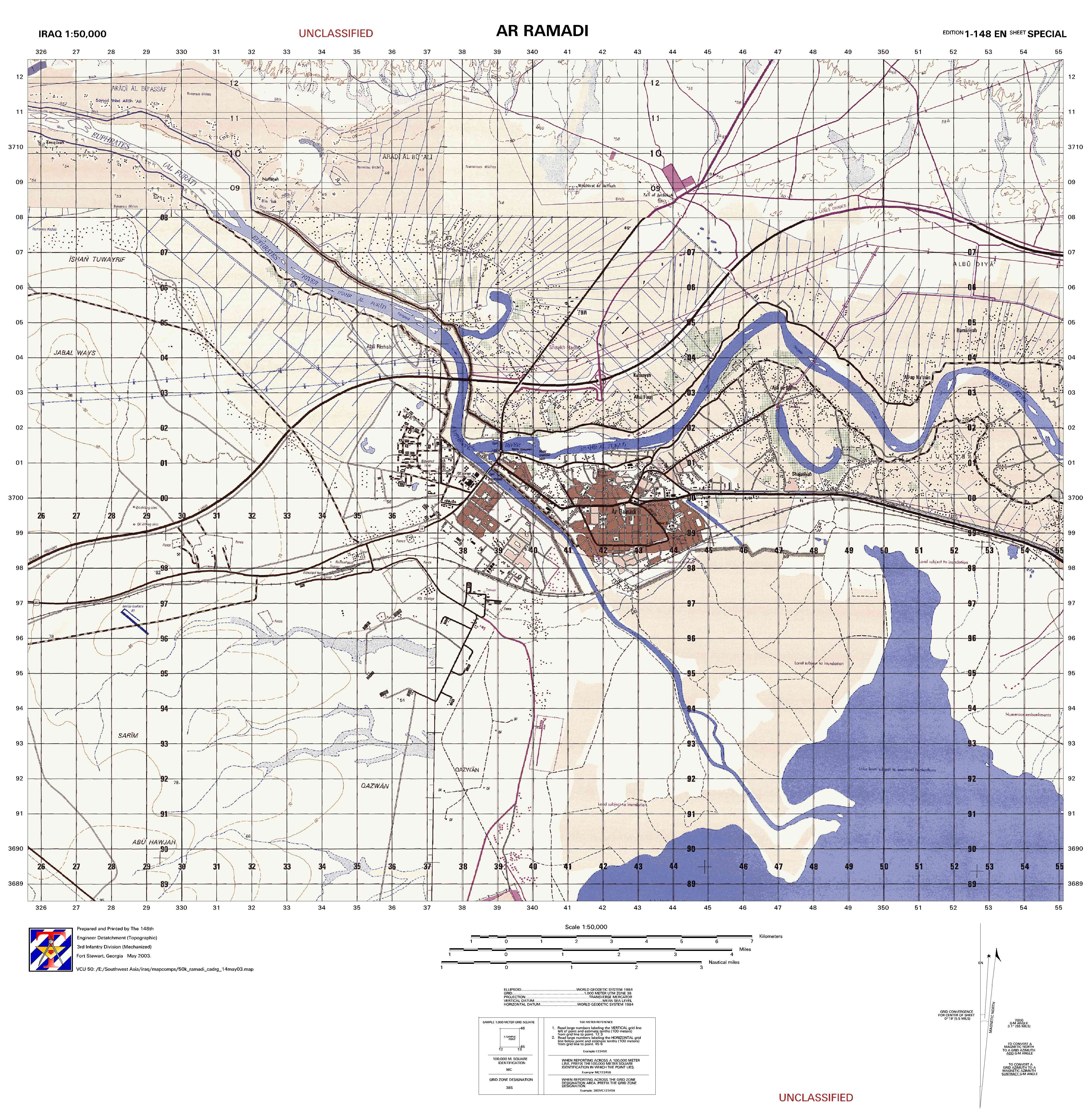
Map of Ramadi in 2003

At the start of the 21st century, Ramadi stretched over an area of about 15 km (9.3 mi) east to west by 12 km (7.5 mi) north to south. The center of the city is densely built up, with numerous more spread-out residential suburbs surrounding it. The city center is bounded to the north by the Euphrates, to the east by suburbs, to the south by the railway line between Baghdad and Haditha, and to the west by the Habbaniyah Canal. More suburbs exist to the west and northwest of the canal and north of the Euphrates.

The city center is connected to the suburbs by two major bridges, one across the Euphrates and the other across the canal, while the western and northern suburbs are connected by a major highway that crosses the Euphrates north of the city. Various tribal groups live in separate districts within the suburbs, with dozens of sheikhs being responsible for maintaining the security and well-being of their particular grouping. The suburbs are extensively criss-crossed with canals that are used to irrigate the farmland around the city.

Ramadi's recent origins mean that it is dominated by modern concrete buildings, mostly flat-roofed two- or three-story structures but with a number of taller buildings in the city center. Its modern origins mean that it lacks features typical of older Iraqi cities, such as a kasbah. The Japanese-built city hospital, with seven stories, is the tallest building in Ramadi. The city was badly damaged during the Iraq war and insurgency. Many buildings were destroyed and many more were rendered uninhabitable.

== Climate ==
Ramadi has a hot desert climate (BWh) in the Köppen–Geiger climate classification system. Most rain falls in the winter. The average annual temperature in Ramadi is 22.4 °C (72.3 °F). About 115 mm (4.53 in) of precipitation falls annually. Sand storms often occur in the warmer months in this region.

Climate data for Ramadi
Month	Jan	Feb	Mar	Apr	May	Jun	Jul	Aug	Sep	Oct	Nov	Dec	Year
Record high °C (°F)	25 (77)	28.0 (82.4)	37.0 (98.6)	42.0 (107.6)	47.3 (117.1)	49.6 (121.3)	49.4 (120.9)	49.6 (121.3)	48.0 (118.4)	40.6 (105.1)	32.3 (90.1)	26.3 (79.3)	49.6 (121.3)
Mean daily maximum °C (°F)	16.4 (61.6)	18.7 (65.7)	23.7 (74.6)	31 (87)	36.8 (98.2)	41.0 (105.8)	44.1 (111.4)	44.5 (112.1)	40.3 (104.6)	33 (92)	23.7 (74.6)	17.3 (63.2)	30.9 (87.6)
Daily mean °C (°F)	10.8 (51.4)	13.2 (55.8)	18.2 (64.8)	24.3 (75.8)	30.6 (87.1)	34.7 (94.5)	37.7 (99.8)	38.1 (100.5)	33.8 (92.9)	26.8 (80.3)	17.8 (64.1)	12.1 (53.7)	24.8 (76.7)
Mean daily minimum °C (°F)	5.3 (41.5)	7.4 (45.4)	11.9 (53.5)	16.8 (62.2)	22.6 (72.6)	26.3 (79.4)	28.7 (83.7)	29 (85)	25.6 (78.1)	19.6 (67.2)	12.2 (53.9)	7.1 (44.8)	17.7 (63.9)
Record low °C (°F)	−4.0 (24.8)	−1.5 (29.3)	3.5 (38.3)	7.4 (45.3)	11 (52)	17.3 (63.1)	22.6 (72.7)	22.5 (72.5)	17.0 (62.6)	11.8 (53.2)	3.0 (37.4)	−2.0 (28.4)	−4.0 (24.8)
Average precipitation mm (inches)	36 (1.41)	25 (0.98)	26 (1.03)	7.9 (0.31)	5.8 (0.23)	0.25 (0.01)	trace	0 (0)	0 (0)	1.3 (0.05)	7.6 (0.30)	13 (0.51)	122.85 (4.83)
Average precipitation days	3.4	3.6	3.3	3	1.1	0.2	0.1	0	0	0.75	1.7	2.6	19.75
Source: NOAA

== See also ==
- List of places in Iraq
- Occupation of Iraq (2003–11)
- Battle of Ramadi (2006)
- Battle of Ramadi (2014–15)
