= Rick Perry presidential campaign =

Rick Perry has unsuccessfully run for president two times; it may refer to:

- Rick Perry 2012 presidential campaign
- Rick Perry 2016 presidential campaign
