= Marcus Luttrell =

U.S. Navy SEAL and author (born 1975)

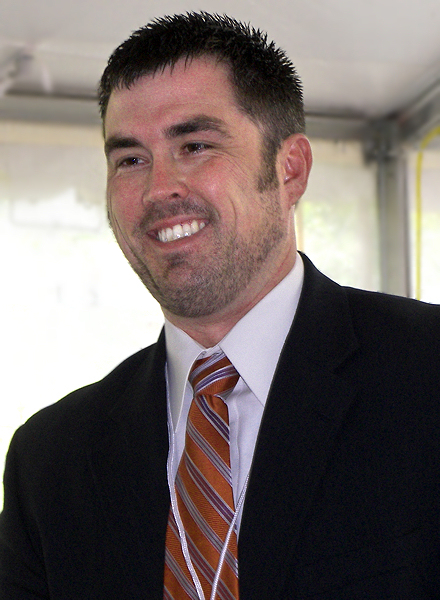
- Luttrell in 2007
- Born: November 7, 1975 (age 50); Houston, Texas, U.S.
- Alma mater: Sam Houston State University (attended)
- Spouse: Melanie Juneau (m. 2010)
- Children: 2
- Relatives: Morgan (twin brother)
- Military career
- Allegiance: United States
- Branch: United States Navy
- Service years: 1999–2007
- Rank: Petty Officer First Class
- Units: United States Navy SEALs; SEAL Team 5; SEAL Team 10; SDV Team 1
- Conflicts: Iraq War; Invasion of Iraq; Battle of Ramadi; War in Afghanistan; Operation Red Wings (WIA)
- Awards: Navy Cross; Bronze Star Medal; Purple Heart
- Other work: Lone Survivor (2007)
- Website: Campaign website

Marcus Luttrell (born November 7, 1975) is a retired United States Navy SEAL who received the Navy Cross and Purple Heart for his actions in June 2005 against Taliban fighters during Operation Red Wings in which he was the lone survivor. Marcus Luttrell was saved because an Afghan villager named Mohammad Gulab found him, provided shelter, and protected him from the Taliban, following the traditional Pashtunwali code of hospitality. Gulab then alerted American forces, leading to a massive rescue operation that extracted the wounded SEAL. Luttrell became an SO1 by the end of his eight-year career in the United States Navy.

Luttrell co-hosts After Action, a TV show in which former special operations veterans talk about issues in the United States. Glenn Beck is the executive producer of the show, which airs on TheBlaze.

== Early life and education ==
Luttrell was born in Houston, Texas, on November 7, 1975. He began training for the U.S. Navy SEALs at the age of 14, with U.S. Army veteran Billy Shelton, who lived near Luttrell's home. Luttrell trained every day with his twin brother, Morgan, and others who aspired to join the U.S. Navy and other special operations forces. Shelton trained them using various weight and endurance exercises. After attending high school at Willis High School in Willis, Texas, Luttrell went to Sam Houston State University where he was a member of the Epsilon Zeta chapter of Delta Tau Delta fraternity. He departed school in 1998 without graduating to enlist in the Navy.

== Career ==
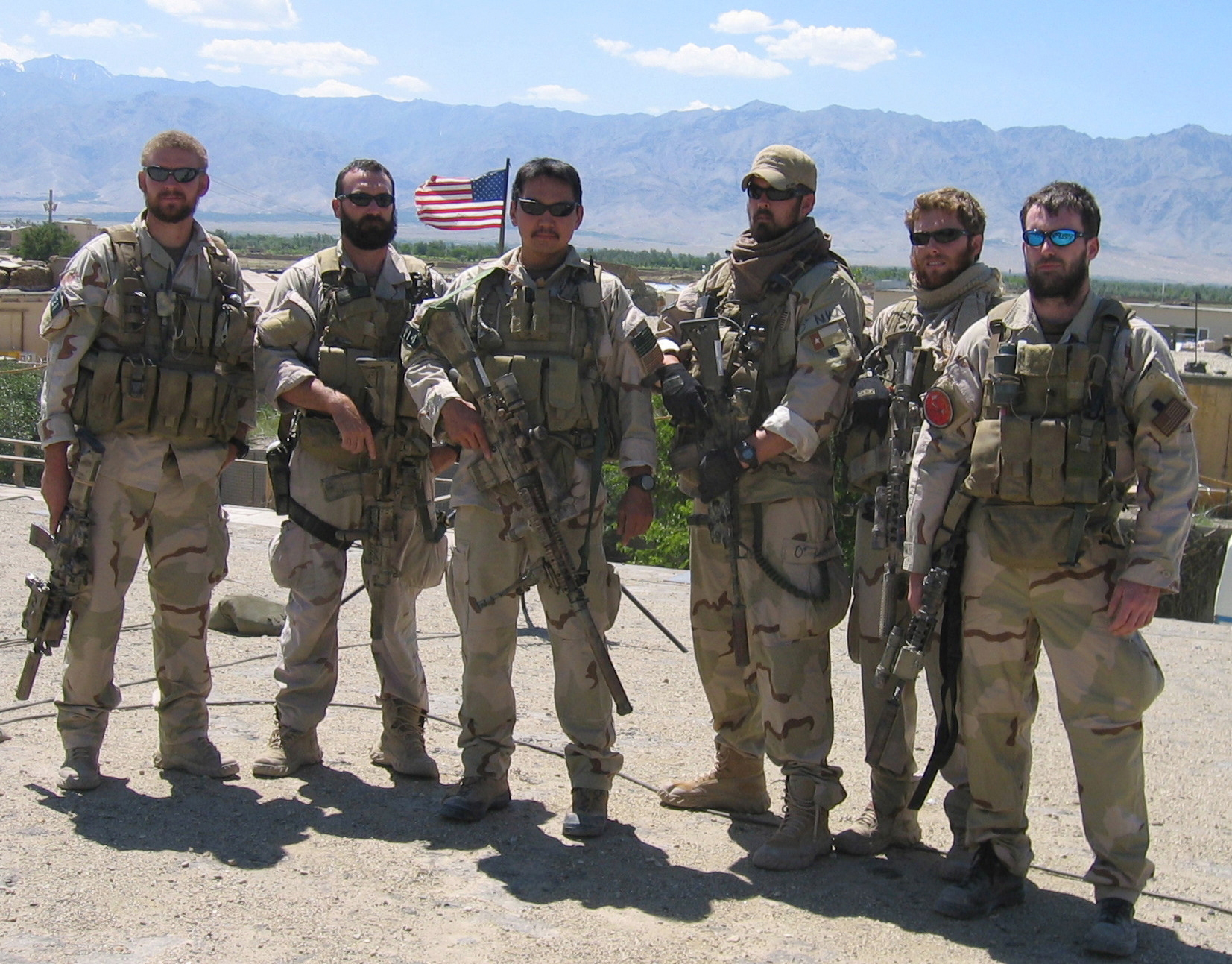
Navy SEALs of Operation Red Wings, with Luttrell being the third from the right.

=== United States Navy ===
Luttrell enlisted in the U.S. Navy in March 1999. After graduating from boot camp and Hospital Corpsman A-school, he transferred to Basic Underwater Demolition/SEAL (BUD/S) Class 226. However, due to a fractured femur he suffered from falling off a rope, he graduated with BUD/S class 228 on April 21, 2000. During BUD/S, Luttrell had his civilian twin brother Morgan impersonate him for several days in order to rest. After completing BUD/S, Luttrell attended Army jump school and SEAL Qualification Training (SQT). Luttrell earned his Navy Enlisted Classification (NEC) 5326 Combatant Swimmer (SEAL) and Naval Special Warfare Insignia on February 2, 2001, after completing SQT. He was then sent to Fort Bragg, North Carolina, for the Special Operations Combat Medic (SOCM) course. SOCM was an additional six months of advanced training in conventional and unconventional medical skills, ranging from diagnosis and treatment of many conditions to advanced emergency medicine and battlefield life support. He was deployed to Iraq with SEAL Team 5 on April 14, 2003, during the 2003 invasion of Iraq, to quell leftover Iraqi resistance and join the search for WMDs. Afterward, he carried out operations to eliminate or capture terrorists.

He was deployed to Afghanistan in 2005 with SEAL Team Ten as part of SEAL Delivery Vehicle Team One (SDV-1).

==== Operation Red Wings ====
While in Afghanistan, he was involved in Operation Red Wings, during which the four-man Special Reconnaissance element with SDV-1 was noticed by local herdsmen. The team understood that the local herdsmen might reveal their whereabouts to Taliban fighters but also recognized that the herdsmen were unarmed and did not appear to be combatants. Despite the risk, the SEAL team allowed the herdsmen to leave. Soon thereafter, the SEAL team was ambushed, and only Luttrell survived. Luttrell was awarded the Navy Cross for his actions during the operation.

During the ambush of Operation Red Wings the four SEALs were attacked from three sides and took fire from RPK machine guns, AK-47s, RPG-7s, and 82mm mortars. The attack forced the SEALs into the northeast gorge of the Shuryek Valley side of Sawtalo Sar. The SEALs made a number of attempts to contact their combat operations center with a PRC-148 MBITR (Multi Band Inter/Intra Team Radio) and then with an Iridium satellite phone. They could not establish consistent communication, however, other than for a period long enough to indicate that they were under attack. Three of the four team members were killed, and Luttrell, the only survivor, was left unconscious with a number of fractures, a broken back, and numerous shrapnel wounds. Members of SEAL Team Ten attempted a rescue during the firefight, but their helicopter was shot down, and all aboard were killed. Luttrell regained consciousness and evaded the pursuing enemy, with the help of local Pashtun villagers, one of them being Mohammad Gulab, who eventually sent an emissary to the nearest U.S. base to secure Luttrell's safe rescue and ultimately saved his life.

Luttrell was rescued on July 2 by Army Rangers and Afghan National Army soldiers in the woods when Gulab and several villagers were trying to get Luttrell to a safe location. United States Air Force Pararescuemen (PJs) Josh Appel and Chris Piercecchi of the 59th Expeditionary Rescue Squadron (305th Rescue Squadron deployed) were involved in the rescue and recovery of Luttrell. Based on Luttrell's descriptions of the area, Appel and Piercecchi returned to the site of the battle two days later and retrieved the remains of Dietz, Murphy and Axelson.

The target of Operation Red Wings, Mohammad Ismail alias Ahmad Shah, survived the American operation but was killed during a firefight with Pakistani police in Khyber Pakhtunkhwa in April 2008.

After recovering from his injuries, Luttrell returned to full-duty and deployed to Ramadi during Operation Iraqi Freedom in 2006, as part of SEAL Team Five. He later had his knees blown out and fractured his spine again. These injuries ultimately led to his discharge.

=== Navy Cross ===
In 2007, Luttrell was awarded the Navy Cross by President Bush.

=== Returning home ===
Luttrell returned to the U.S. in 2007 and co-authored the New York Times bestseller Lone Survivor: The Eyewitness Account of Operation Redwing and the Lost Heroes of SEAL Team 10. A film version, starring Mark Wahlberg, was released on December 25, 2013.

In 2007, Luttrell was medically discharged from the Navy. In 2009, he was granted a medical retirement through the Board for the Correction of Naval Records. Luttrell and his brother Morgan have undergone psychedelic therapy for injuries sustained during their service.

In May 2012, Little, Brown and Company released Luttrell's latest book, co-authored with James D. Hornfischer, Service: A Navy SEAL at War.

==== Lone Survivor Foundation ====
In 2010, Luttrell established the Lone Survivor Foundation. The mission of the foundation, headquartered in Houston, Texas, is to "restore, empower, and renew hope for our wounded warriors and their families through health, wellness, and therapeutic support."

Luttrell and The Lone Survivor Foundation partnered with The Boot Campaign to help show tangible appreciation of America's active-duty military, raise awareness of the challenges they face upon return, and support the transition home.

== Personal life ==
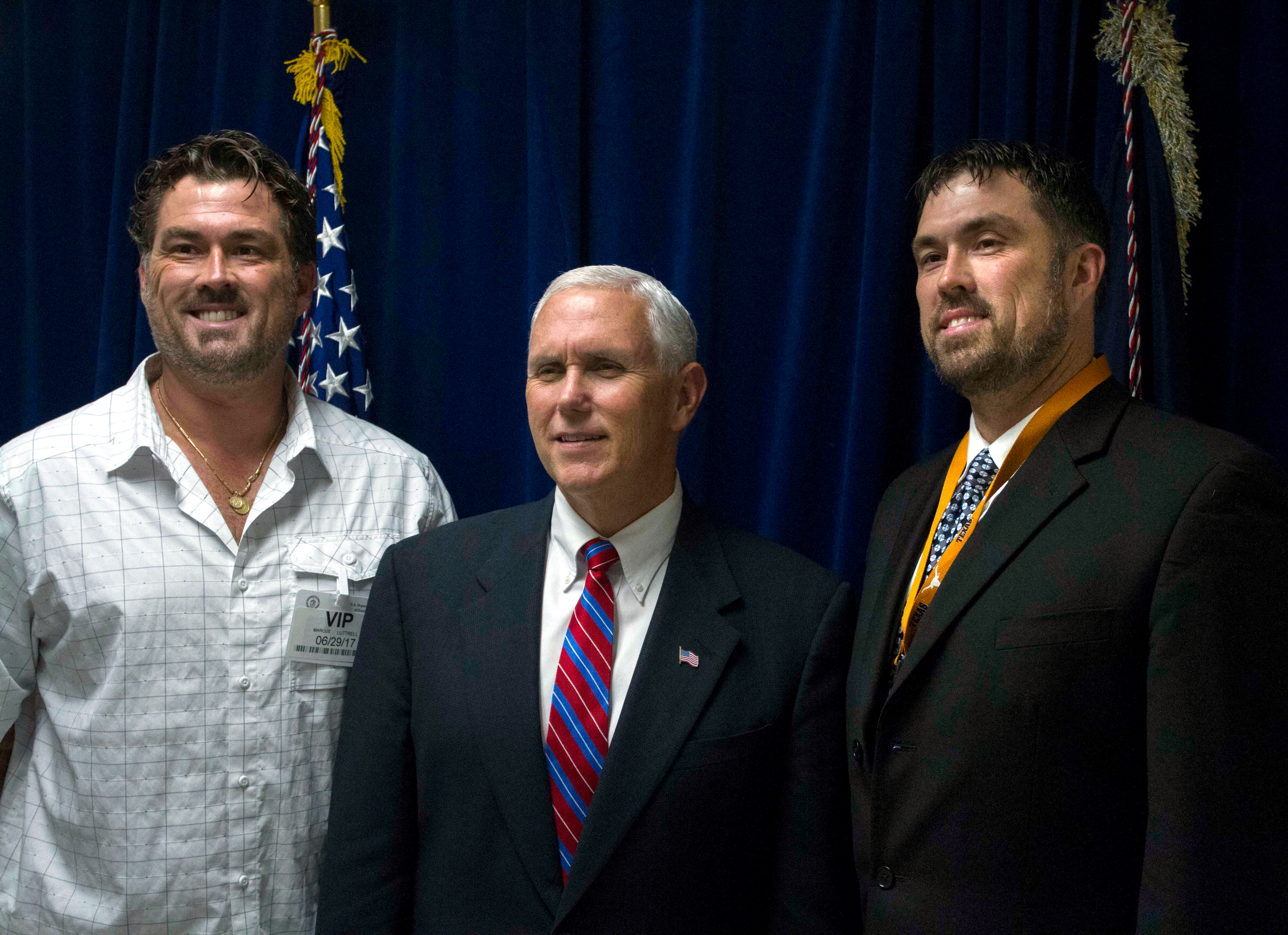
Marcus (left) and twin brother Morgan Luttrell, with then Vice President Mike Pence

Luttrell married Melanie Juneau on November 27, 2010, in Texas. Their son Axe, named after fallen SEAL comrade Matthew Axelson, was born on May 8, 2011. On January 14, 2012, at an event for St. Jude Children's Research Hospital, Luttrell announced that he and his wife were expecting their second child. Their daughter, Addie, was born on August 26, 2012.

Luttrell's twin brother Morgan Luttrell is also a former Navy SEAL; he left the Navy with the rank of lieutenant. Morgan served as advisor to Energy Secretary Rick Perry during the Donald Trump administration. On November 8, 2022, Morgan was elected to represent Texas's 8th congressional district.

Luttrell endorsed the 2016 presidential campaign of former Texas governor Rick Perry and was present, alongside his twin brother Morgan, at Perry's formal announcement on June 4, 2015. Luttrell spoke at the 2016 Republican National Convention in support of Donald Trump.

== DASY ==
As part of Luttrell's recuperation he was given a yellow Labrador puppy, whom he named DASY. Each letter of the name "DASY" represents one of the members of his team—Danny Dietz, Matthew "Axe" Axelson, Southern boy (Marcus), and Michael "Yankee" Murphy. DASY was given to Luttrell during his recovery, to help him through rehabilitation.

On April 1, 2009, at approximately 1:00 A.M., four men approached Luttrell's property and killed DASY with a .357 Magnum revolver. Luttrell proceeded to chase the individuals through four counties, in his truck, armed with two 9 mm Berettas, until Onalaska Police apprehended the individuals. Upon arrest, the suspects verbally threatened Luttrell's life and taunted him. Alfonso Hernandez was arrested on-scene for driving without a valid driver's license, and he was later charged with animal cruelty. Michael Edmonds turned himself in on April 7, was booked, and posted bond on the same charge. The other two individuals were not indicted. The males are also suspects in the killings of other neighborhood dogs. On November 29, 2011, Luttrell posted on his page that "Court date on Thursday for DASY's killer's I'll keep y'all posted on what happens. It's only been almost 3 years glad it's finally here", and again on December 1, 2011, saying they were found guilty.

On March 7, 2012, Alfonso Hernandez was given the maximum sentence of two years in a state jail, for the felony charge of animal cruelty, and was fined $1,000. After his guilty plea and testimony against Hernandez, Michael John Edmonds was sentenced to five years probation and fined $1,000 for the same offense. At the sentencing, Luttrell testified that he was “still pretty upset” about the killing of DASY and that he felt both defendants should have gotten the maximum sentence.

== Operation Red Wings controversy ==
There is some conflict over the exact number of Taliban forces involved in the engagement. Luttrell filed an official after-action report in which he estimated the size of the Taliban force to be around 20–35. He claims in his book that his team were told in their briefing that around 80 to 200 fighters were expected to be in the area. Initial intel estimates were approximately 10 to 20. Official media reports from the military estimated that the Taliban force was around 20 as well, while the Navy cited 30–40 enemies in the Medal of Honor citation for LT Michael P. Murphy. In the Summary of Action related to the same Medal of Honor, the Navy cites an "enemy force of more than 50 anti-coalition militia". Ed Darack cites a military intelligence report in his book Victory Point: Operations Red Wings and Whalers, stating that the Taliban force was 8–10, compared to the 80–200 claimed by Luttrell in Lone Survivor. The military intelligence estimate cited by Darack is based on research from intelligence reports and aerial and eye-witness studies of the battlefield after the fact, including the men sent in to rescue Luttrell, as well as reports from Afghan intelligence.

Luttrell claimed in Lone Survivor that Murphy considered killing the unarmed civilians who stumbled upon the SEAL reconnaissance team and even put it to a vote, but this has been criticized and dismissed by many as fiction. Navy Special Warfare Command spokesman Lieutenant Steve Ruh stated that "the senior guy ultimately has the ultimate authority" for making decisions in the field. He also stated that "this is the first time I've ever heard of anything put to a vote like that. In my 14 years of Navy experience, I've never seen or heard of anything like that." Murphy's father claims in the June 12, 2007 article "Survivor's book dishonors son's memory" in Newsday that his son would never have considered killing unarmed civilians, let alone putting such a grave decision up for a vote. Military protocol and rules of engagement strictly forbid harming unarmed non-combatant civilians.

Mohammad Gulab, the Afghan villager who rescued Luttrell, also disputes Luttrell's version of the story. Luttrell claims that he fired off nearly all of his rounds, but Gulab said that he was found with all 11 magazines of ammunition. Gulab also said that the Taliban heard the helicopter drop off the SEAL team, then tracked their footprints. When the Taliban found them, they were debating about what to do with the herdsmen, so they held back. After they released them, the Taliban decided to attack. Gulab claims that the locals heard the firefight, searched the hills afterward, and found no Taliban corpses. Andrew MacMannis is a former Marine Colonel who helped plan the mission and was on location for the recovery operation, and he says that there were no reports of any enemy casualties. Luttrel hid with all 11 magazines of his rifle beneath the rock until the attacking Taliban group retreated. Two videos that the Taliban shot during the firefight only show seven men in Ahmad Shah's militia. Gulab claims that he was never given the chance to tell his side of the story, and that his interpreter before a 60 Minutes interview told him, "Whatever Marcus says in the interview, say yes."

== Awards and decorations ==
Luttrell has received the below awards.

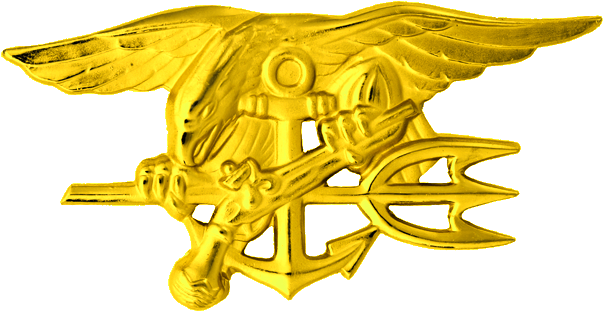

Badge	Special Warfare Insignia		
1st row	Navy Cross		
2nd row	Bronze Star with "V" device	Purple Heart	Navy Commendation Medal
3rd row	Army Commendation Medal with 2 Oak leaf clusters	Navy Achievement Medal with 4 5/16 inch stars	Army Achievement Medal
4th row	Combat Action Ribbon with 1 5/16 inch star	Navy Presidential Unit Citation	Navy Unit Commendation
5th row	Navy Meritorious Unit Commendation	Navy Good Conduct Medal with 1 Service star	National Defense Service Medal
6th row	Armed Forces Expeditionary Medal	Afghanistan Campaign Medal with 1 Campaign star	Iraq Campaign Medal with 2 Campaign stars
7th row	Global War on Terrorism Expeditionary Medal	Global War on Terrorism Service Medal	Navy and Marine Corps Sea Service Deployment Ribbon with 2 Service stars
8th row	NATO Medal for service with ISAF	Navy Rifle Marksmanship Medal with expert device	Navy Pistol Marksmanship Medal with expert device
Badge	Navy and Marine Corps Parachutist Insignia		

== In popular culture ==
=== Films ===
- In the film Lone Survivor (2013), Luttrell was portrayed by actor Mark Wahlberg. Luttrell makes a significant cameo appearance (uncredited) in at least three scenes in the film and is present in other scenes, as well. He first appears as one of the SEALs, referred to as "Frankie" by Lt. Murphy (Taylor Kitsch), lightheartedly hazing rookie SEAL Shane Patton (Alexander Ludwig) before the mission, jokingly giving Shane his first mission or "op" of cleaning the table, supplemented by knocking over a drink. His second appearance is during the presentation of the rules of engagement for Operation Red Wings where he can be seen shaking his head at the rules governing return fire. This scene is significant. In his book, Lone Survivor, Marcus explains extensively how these rules created substantial risk for the forces in Afghanistan. His third appearance is later in the film as one of the 16 special operators aboard the doomed Chinook helicopter sent to rescue Luttrell and his team. The camera stops on him and several real-life SEALs just before the Taliban's rocket-propelled grenade comes through the open rear bay door and impacts the Chinook's interior, killing everyone aboard. "I was on the other side of the mountain when those guys came to help me," Luttrell says of his real-life experience, "so getting to die on the helicopter in the movie was a very powerful moment for me."
- Luttrell had a brief role in the veteran funded movie Range 15.

=== Literature ===
- In his book American Sniper: The Autobiography of the Most Lethal Sniper in U.S. Military History (2012), Chris Kyle says he and fellow Navy SEAL Luttrell were friends, and Kyle encourages his readers to also read Luttrell's book, Lone Survivor.

=== Television ===
- Luttrell appears in a Season 9 episode of the A&E series Duck Dynasty, visiting West Monroe, Louisiana to honor two wounded Marines for their service.
- Luttrell appears in Season 9 episode 4 of the Discovery series Overhaulin', having a '67 Ford Mustang built to honor his service.
- Luttrell appeared in a speech at the Republican National Convention on July 18, 2016. Luttrell offered his endorsement for the eventual forty-fifth and forty-seventh president Donald Trump.

== See also ==
- List of United States Navy SEALs
