= Rick Perry 2016 presidential campaign =

Presidential campaign

Rick Perry for President 2016
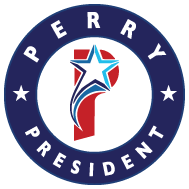
- Campaign: Republican primaries U.S. presidential election, 2016
- Candidate: Rick Perry; Governor of Texas (2000–2015); Lieutenant Governor of Texas (1999–2000)
- Affiliation: Republican Party
- Status: Announced: June 4, 2015; Withdrew: September 11, 2015
- Headquarters: P.O. Box 162406; Houston, Texas
- Receipts: US$1,427,133 (2015-12-31)

Website
- www.rickperry.org

The 2016 presidential campaign of Rick Perry, the 47th governor of Texas, was officially launched on June 4, 2015. This campaign constituted Perry's second consecutive bid for the Republican nomination for President of the United States. Perry announced on September 11, 2015, that he had suspended his campaign.

On January 25, 2016, Perry announced that he would endorse presidential candidate and fellow Texan, Senator Ted Cruz.

== Background ==
Perry was elected Lieutenant Governor of Texas in 1998, and assumed the Governorship in 2000 after George W. Bush resigned to become president himself. Perry was subsequently elected to three full terms in 2002, 2006 and 2010 and is the fourth Texas governor to serve three terms. Having served the remaining two years of Bush's second term, along with three terms outright, Perry is the longest-served governor in Texas history and left office on his own accord in 2015 with former Texas Attorney General Greg Abbott succeeding him.

In 2012, Perry sought the Republican nomination, but after poor results in Iowa and New Hampshire, and after having made several gaffes which hurt his candidacy, he withdrew on January 19, 2012, prior to the South Carolina primaries.

Perry had hinted of another presidential campaign as early as early 2014 when he announced that he would not seek re-election for a record fourth full term as Texas Governor.

He had also prepared extensively for a presidential campaign, holding a number of policy sessions and briefings with think tanks, including The Heritage Foundation, the American Enterprise Institute, and others across the political spectrum. Perry had also held policy briefings with former Secretary of State Henry Kissinger prior to his announcement.

== Campaign announcement ==
Perry had hinted of running for president as early as 2014 and officially announced his candidacy on June 4, at a press event in a hangar at Addison Airport near Dallas, Texas, in front of a Lockheed C-130 Hercules bearing his campaign logo. He walked up to the stage to a version of Colt Ford's "Answer to No One" song.

He later conducted an hour-long interview with Sean Hannity of Fox News Channel.

Perry was flanked by former US Navy Seals which included Marcus Luttrell, his twin brother Morgan Luttrell, Mike Thornton, Pete Scobell, Paul Craig and JJ Jones as well as former Marine, Captain Dan Moran. Also present was Tara Kyle, the widow of Chris Kyle, the author of the biography American Sniper, which was later adapted into a blockbuster film.

On June 19, 2014, at lunch organized by the Christian Science Monitor Perry criticized the Obama administration's policies on climate change, including proposed regulation of greenhouse gases, saying ""Calling CO2 a pollutant is doing a disservice the country...I’m not a scientist...I don’t believe that we have the settled science by any sense of the imagination...". He said he was offended by being called a "denier." He said he supports the Keystone XL pipeline.

== Debate performances ==
After poor performances in the 2012 GOP presidential debates, Perry stated he had prepared for years to be ready for the 2016 debates.

Perry was determined by Fox News criteria to be eleventh in polling, losing out the coveted tenth spot to Ohio Governor John Kasich, whose late entry into the race allowed him to sustain a poll bump in the polls which allowed him to enter the top-tier debates. Fox News had used the most recent non-partisan polls from Bloomberg, CBS News, NBC News, Monmouth University and Quinnipiac University as well as its own.

Perry was subsequently invited to the undercard debate scheduled at 5pm before the prime-time top 10 candidate debate held in Cleveland, Ohio at the Quicken Loans Arena where the 2016 Republican National Convention would also take place.

The Governor's performance in the debate was considered strong and he commanded the third longest talk time among the eight participants. However he was overshadowed largely by former Hewlett-Packard Chief Executive, Carly Fiorina, whose strong performance catapulted her into the top-tier for the 2016 Republican nomination.

During an answer to a question about immigration, Governor Perry seemed to have referred to former President Ronald Reagan as 'Ronald Raven.' After the debate, a Perry campaign spokesperson said the Governor "clearly said Ronald Reagan."

Despite his financial woes, Perry was invited to participate in the second debate, held at the Ronald Reagan Presidential Library and hosted by CNN on September 16, where he needed a breakout moment like Fiorina's. However, Perry withdrew from the race before the debate and did not participate.

== Campaign ==
Perry delivered his first real policy speech on July 2 at the National Press Club. In his speech, Perry laid out his economic agenda, at the same time criticizing the Republican Party for their previous attitudes towards race. Perry's speech was widely praised with the Wall Street Journal saying that it was "the speech of the campaign so far". Perry also delivered a second policy speech on Wall Street at the Yale Club in New York on July 29 where he called for reforms on Wall Street.

Perry was also the first Republican candidate to come out against Donald Trump, calling Trump's candidacy a "mix of demagoguery, mean-spiritedness and nonsense" and a "cancer on conservatism". On July 21, 2015, during a campaign event in South Carolina, Trump said of Perry: "He put glasses on so people will think he's smart. And it just doesn't work! People can see through the glasses."

In April 2015, Avik Roy was appointed as senior policy officer of Perry's 2016 presidential campaign and its affiliated committee RickPAC. Roy’s responsibilities centered on domestic policy development, particularly health-care and economic policy.

The Perry campaign raised $1.1 million between April and June 2015 while his affiliated superpac, the Opportunity and Freedom PAC raised in excess of $17 million.

On August 10, the Perry campaign announced it was unable to pay campaign staff due to a lack of fundraising. Despite this, over 90% of Perry's staff stayed on with the campaign. The Perry campaign in early September resumed paying two full-time staff, one in Iowa and another in South Carolina. This made him eligible for the upcoming CNN debate on September 16 as a requirement was for candidates to have two paid staffers in first four early voting states. This also effectively signaled the end of Perry's campaign in New Hampshire where he would focus instead on more conservative Iowa and South Carolina.

On August 24, Perry's Iowa campaign chairman, Sam Clovis, resigned from the campaign in part because he was no longer being compensated. Clovis subsequently joined Donald Trump's presidential campaign, serving as a national policy adviser. Karen Fesler, Perry's Iowa co-chair also resigned from the campaign, joining the Rick Santorum campaign where she had previously supported in the 2012 cycle.

The Opportunity and Freedom PAC took further steps to help Perry's campaign with the hiring of Marshall Critchfield, who resigned as Republican chairman of Jasper County, as its Iowa political director to help run caucus organization and voter turnout operations on behalf of Perry. The superpac assumed much of what would be the traditional campaign's duties in light of the Perry's campaign poor fundraising.

On September 11 at a conservative gathering in St Louis, Missouri, Perry announced he was suspending his race for the Presidency of the United States, adding, "We have a tremendous field – the best in a generation – so I step aside knowing our party is in good hands."

Perry endorsed U.S. Senator and fellow Texan Ted Cruz on January 24, 2016.

== Endorsements ==
Rick Perry endorsements

U.S. Representatives (current)

- Texas: Joe Barton

State legislators

- Iowa State Senator: David Johnson
- Iowa State Representative: Dawn Pettengill (2004–2007 Democratic then 2007–present Republican)

Businessmen

- Texas: Thomas Friedkin (actor/automotive), Kenny Troutt (telecom)

Celebrities, commentators, and activists

- Dean Cain, actor
- Brad Thor, novelist and conservative activist
- Taya Kyle, widow of U.S. Navy SEAL Chris Kyle
- Marcus Luttrell, U.S. Navy SEAL and author
- Michael Thornton, retired U.S. Navy SEAL and Medal of Honor recipient

== See also ==
- Rick Perry presidential campaign, 2012
- Republican Party presidential primaries, 2016
- Republican Party presidential candidates, 2016
