= American Sniper (book) =

2012 autobiography by Chris Kyle

- Paperback cover
- Author: Chris Kyle; Scott McEwen; Jim DeFelice
- Language: English
- Subject: Personal memories
- Publisher: William Morrow and Company, an imprint of HarperCollins
- Publication date: January 2, 2012
- Publication place: United States
- Media type: Hardcover; Audiobook; Paperback
- Pages: 400
- ISBN: 978-0062082350

American Sniper: The Autobiography of the Most Lethal Sniper in U.S. Military History is an autobiography by United States Navy SEAL Chris Kyle, written with Scott McEwen and Jim DeFelice. The book was published by William Morrow and Company on January 2, 2012 and appeared on The New York Times Best Seller list for 37 weeks.

The memoir has sold over 1.2 million copies in the first two years of release. Its film adaptation directed by Clint Eastwood and starring actor Bradley Cooper as Kyle was released in 2014. In 2015, after the film's release, book sales increased and it receached No. 1 on best-seller lists. It landed atop all the major best-seller lists published by The New York Times, as well as Publishers Weekly and USA Today, and it reached No. 2 on Amazon.

== Plot overview ==
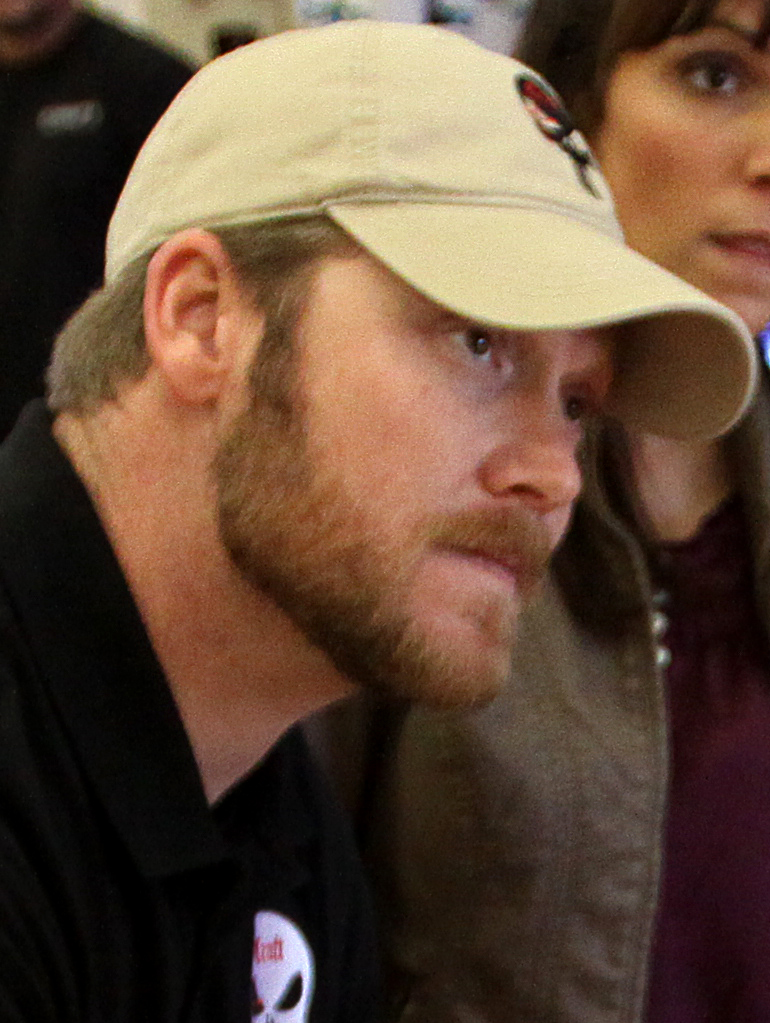
Chris Kyle, the author and subject of the autobiography.

American Sniper tells the story of Chris Kyle, a Navy SEAL who completed four tours in Iraq from 1999 to 2009. The book describes Kyle's upbringing in Odessa, Texas, Navy SEAL training, and combat experiences in Iraq.

Kyle describes his role in the battle for control of Ramadi, events he claims led to Iraqi insurgents' nicknaming Kyle the "Devil of Ramadi" and placing a bounty on his head. He writes that after his first confirmed kill, "the others come easy. I don't have to psych myself up, or do something special mentally—I look through the scope, get my target in the cross hairs, and kill my enemy, before he kills one of my people."

== Reaction ==
=== Post-publication retraction ===
In July 2014, the sub-chapter "Punching Out Scruff Face" was removed from later editions of the book, after a three-week trial in U.S. Federal Court wherein the jury found that the author, Chris Kyle, had unjustly enriched himself by defaming plaintiff Jesse Ventura. In the book, Kyle described blackening the eye of "Scruff Face", whom he later identified in media interviews as Jesse Ventura. The jury awarded Ventura $500,000 for defamation and $1,345,477.25 for unjust enrichment. In December 2014, attorneys for Ventura filed a separate lawsuit against HarperCollins, the parent company of the publisher, for failing to check the accuracy of the story it used in publicity. The suit alleges that the false account used in publicity had "increased sales" and generated "millions of dollars for HarperCollins." On June 13, 2016, the United States Court of Appeals for the Eighth Circuit vacated the verdict on the defamation count, remanding the case for a new trial on that count, and reversed the unjust enrichment verdict outright. The court cited legal and procedural errors in the trial without deciding whether Kyle's allegations were true or not. In December 2017, Ventura settled with Kyle's estate and dropped his suit against HarperCollins.

=== Charity donation claims ===
Some sources claimed Kyle's family had said all his book proceeds were donated to veterans' charities. Salon and National Review disputed the donation amount, asserting that around 2 percent ($52,000) went to the charities, while Kyle's family received $3 million.

=== Military record claims ===
In May 2016, The Intercept claimed that Kyle's autobiography "embellished" his military record, and that he had been warned by Navy officials about the inaccuracies before publication. Others, including co-author Scott McEwen, disputed this. On May 28, The Hollywood Reporter did an analysis, concluding that the newly released internal Navy documents were inconclusive — that the document that typically is the definitive record of military service matched Kyle's claims and that the Navy had not yet publicly stated this document or the facts within it were incorrect. Kyle's DD Form 214 listed a total of two Silver Stars and six Bronze Stars, more than he claimed in his book. On July 8, 2016, the U.S. Navy corrected Kyle's DD-214 regarding some decorations listed on his original discharge document. The Navy revised it to one Silver Star and four Bronze Stars with valor. The Navy said "Kyle would have played no role in the production of his personnel files other than signing the DD-214 upon his discharge" and "after thoroughly reviewing all available records, the Navy determined an error was made" and "issued a corrected copy of the DD-214, which accurately reflects Kyle's years of honorable and extraordinary service."

== Film adaptation ==
In 2014, Clint Eastwood's film American Sniper was released, which was based on Kyle's autobiography of the same name. It had its world premiere on November 11, 2014, at the American Film Institute Festival, followed by a limited theatrical release in the United States on December 25, 2014. It received a wide release January 16, 2015. In the film, Kyle was portrayed by actor Bradley Cooper. For his portrayal of Kyle, Cooper received an Academy Award nomination for Best Actor, and the film was also nominated in five other categories, including Best Picture. The film won the Academy Award for Best Sound Editing.

== Memorial Edition ==
In 2013, after Kyle's death, a memorial edition was published which includes more than 80 pages of remembrances by his parents; his wife, Taya; his brother; lifelong friends; Marcus Luttrell and other fellow SEALs; veterans and wounded warriors; and many others.
