= Murders of Chris Kyle and Chad Littlefield =

Double murder in Texas in 2013

Murder of Chris Kyle and Chad Littlefield
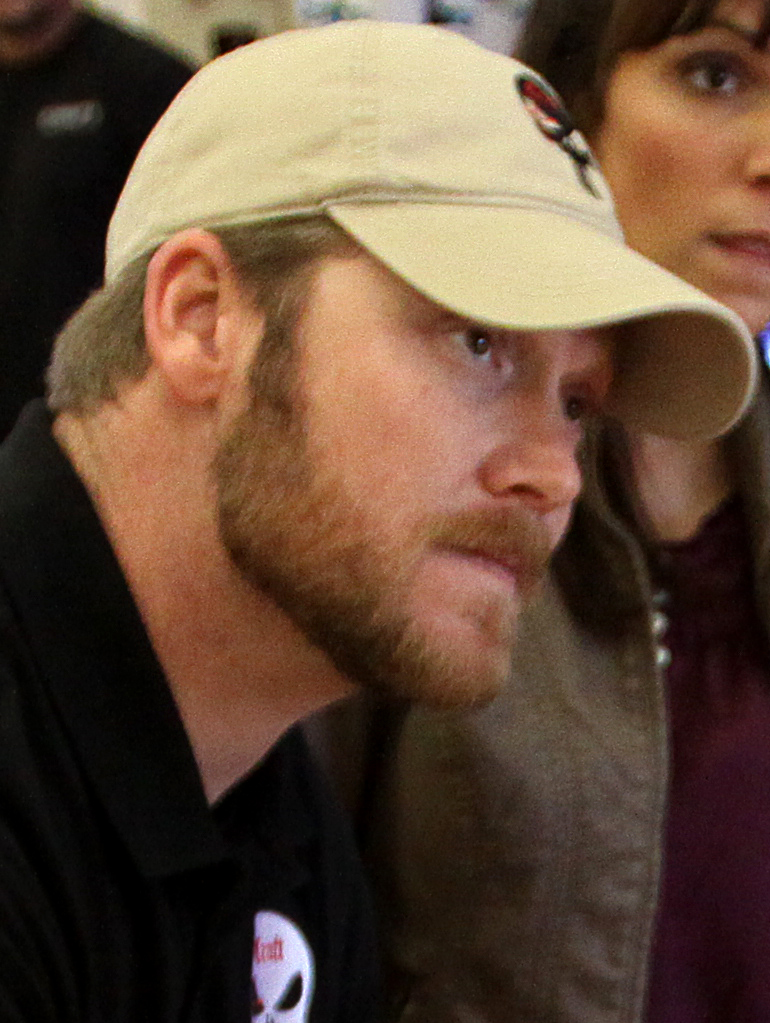
- U.S. Navy SEAL sniper Chris Kyle, one of the murder victims
- Location: 32°6′4″N 97°53′49.7″W; Chalk Mountain, Erath County, Texas, U.S.
- Date: February 2, 2013
- Attack type: Double murder
- Weapons: .45 caliber M1911 pistol; 9mm SIG Sauer P226 Mk.25 Mod 0 pistol
- Victims: 2
- Perpetrator: Eddie Ray Routh
- Motive: Disputed: Paranoid personality disorder exacerbated by alcohol and drug use (prosecution); Schizophrenia and post-traumatic stress disorder (defense)

On February 2, 2013, Christopher Scott Kyle (born April 8, 1974) and his friend Chad Hutson Littlefield (born February 11, 1977) were shot to death at a shooting range near Chalk Mountain, Texas, by Eddie Ray Routh. The two were walking down range to set up targets when Routh opened fire with two handguns and hit both of them. Routh, a Marine veteran who was 25 years old at the time, had post-traumatic stress disorder (PTSD). The case attracted national attention due to Kyle's fame as the author of a bestselling autobiography, American Sniper, published in 2012.

== Murders ==
On February 2, 2013, Kyle, 38, and his friend, Chad Littlefield, 35, were shot and killed by Eddie Ray Routh at the Rough Creek Ranch-Lodge-Resort shooting range in Erath County, Texas. Both Kyle and Littlefield were armed with .45-caliber M1911-style pistols when they were killed, but neither gun had been unholstered or fired, and the safety catches were still on. Kyle was killed with a .45-caliber pistol, while Littlefield was shot with a 9mm SIG Sauer P226 pistol. Both guns belonged to Kyle.

Kyle had begun working with veterans after leaving the military. Routh's mother, who worked at the school that Kyle's children attended, had heard of his work and asked him to help her son. He agreed to take Routh to a shooting range, which Kyle believed had therapeutic value.

Routh was a 25-year-old U.S. Marine Corps veteran from Lancaster, Texas. Kyle and Littlefield had reportedly taken Routh to the gun range in an effort to help him with his post-traumatic stress disorder (PTSD), which he suffered from his time in the military. Routh had also been in and out of mental hospitals for at least two years and had been diagnosed with schizophrenia, although his stated motive did not involve any symptoms typically associated with the disorder, such as hallucinations or delusions. On the way to the shooting range, Kyle texted Littlefield, "This dude is straight up nuts." Littlefield responded, "Watch my six," military slang meaning "watch my back." Four months later, while he was in his jail cell, Routh shared with former Erath County Sheriff's Deputy Gene Cole: "I was just riding in the back seat of the truck, and nobody would talk to me. They were just taking me to the range, so I shot them. I feel bad about it, but they wouldn't talk to me. I'm sure they've forgiven me."

Kyle had been shot six times, including a "rapidly fatal" bullet to the back that pierced his aorta, and another to the jaw that caused a severe spinal cord injury. Littlefield was hit seven times, including four that would have been instantly fatal. One of the gunshot wounds was to the top of the head, indicating it was likely fired while Littlefield was already on the ground.

Crime scene photos shown in court show Kyle lying on the dirt in front of an elevated deck from which rifles were fired at targets up to 1,000 yards (3,000 ft; 910 m) away. Littlefield lay on the same deck nearby.

After the killings, Routh first went to a Taco Bell and bought some burritos, then went to his sister's house in Midlothian and told her what he had done. His sister, Laura Blevins, called 9-1-1 and told the emergency operator: "They went out to a shooting range ... Like, he's all crazy. He's ... psychotic." After that, Routh drove to his home and picked up his dog. Local police first distracted Routh by speaking to him, where he spoke irrationally about Hell, the end of the world, and voodoo. After Routh drove away over a failed attempt to use spike strips, police captured Routh after a short freeway chase, which ended when Routh, who fled the scene in Kyle's Ford F-350 truck, crashed into a police cruiser in Lancaster.

== Perpetrator ==
Eddie Ray Routh was born on September 30, 1987, in Lancaster, Texas, to Raymond and Jodi Routh. He had wanted to join the Marine Corps since he was thirteen years old, and did so after high school. He was deployed to a base near Baghdad in September 2007, where he worked for six months as a prison guard and repaired weapons. In January 2010, he was sent on a humanitarian mission to Haiti. He was honorably discharged from the Marine Corps in July 2011 after serving for four years.

In late July 2011, Routh was diagnosed by clinicians at the Dallas Veterans Affairs hospital as having post-traumatic stress disorder and was prescribed antipsychotics and antidepressants. He was experiencing auditory hallucinations and paranoia and had threatened suicide. VA clinicians believed Routh's psychotic symptoms were caused by alcohol abuse and offered inpatient treatment. He declined and stopped taking his medication.

== Trial ==
Routh was arraigned February 2, 2013, on two counts of capital murder, and was taken to the Erath County Jail for holding under a $3 million bond. His trial was set to begin May 5, 2014, but was delayed to allow more time to comply with DNA testing requirements. The trial began on February 11, 2015.

Routh's attorneys argued that he was insane at the time of the murders. Forensic psychologist Randall Price, a witness for the prosecution, suspected Routh was faking schizophrenia. He said that Routh actually had paranoid personality disorder exacerbated by drug use. He also testified that Routh's psychotic symptoms could be attributed to drug and alcohol abuse. Another expert, Michael Arambula, testified he did not believe Routh was schizophrenic and was not insane at the time of the murders because he was intoxicated.

On February 24, 2015, Routh was found guilty of murdering Kyle and Littlefield. The jury returned the verdict after less than three hours of deliberations. The trial judge, Jason Cashon, immediately sentenced Routh to life in prison with no possibility of parole. Routh is imprisoned at the Texas Department of Criminal Justice Ramsey Unit in Brazoria County, Texas.

== Funerals ==
A memorial service was held for Kyle at AT&T Stadium with thousands of attendees.

A memorial service was held for Kyle at AT&T Stadium in Arlington, Texas, on February 11, 2013. He was buried on February 12, 2013, at the Texas State Cemetery in Austin, after the funeral cortege journeyed from Midlothian to Austin, more than 200 miles (320 km). Thousands of people, many waving American flags, lined Interstate 35 to view the procession and pay their final respects to Kyle.

Littlefield's funeral was held on February 8, 2013, at the First Baptist Church of Midlothian, Texas; he was buried at Mount Zion cemetery.
