= Boot Campaign =

American charitable organization for US veterans

- Founded: 2009
- Founders: Sherri Reuland, Mariae Bui, Ginger Giles, Leigh Ann Ranslem, Heather Sholl
- Type: Non-governmental organization
- Location: Dallas, Texas. United States
- Website: bootcampaign.org

Boot Campaign is a national 501(c)(3) charitable organization with offices in Dallas, Texas. Boot Campaign is accredited by the Better Business Bureau, continues a years-long Platinum rating from Candid (formerly GuideStar), and has been named one of the nation's Great Nonprofits.

== Programs ==
Boot Campaign has three programs in support of veterans, and military families. The Health and Wellness program delivers personalized treatment plans to veterans and their families. The program treats diverse health challenges connected to Posttraumatic Stress and/or Traumatic Brain Injury, as well as addressing trauma-based insomnia, chronic pain, and substance abuse and targets many of the same risk factors associated with suicidal ideation. Boot Campaign program participants represent every branch of the military, and were a part of operations from the Vietnam War through today's present conflicts.

Boot Campaign's Seasons of Service program "united Americans to show gratitude, meet service members’ needs and strives to alleviate stress and financial burden" by delivering specially curated gift boxes to veteran and active duty military families nationwide. The families served through their Seasons of Service program are experiencing an unexpected financial hardship, a major medical challenge in the immediate family, a hardship during the past year(s) due to recently transitioning from the military, change of duty station or an unexpected/extended deployment.

== Retail sales ==
Beginning in 2011, Boot Campaign began selling combat boots as a way to further the mission and raise money to support veterans and military families. Retail sales of branded apparel followed, and Boot Campaign now maintains an online retail shop, where the organization raises money to support its individualized programs through the sales of combat boots, apparel, accessories, and branded gear.

== Financials ==
In addition to required IRS financial filings, Boot Campaign voluntarily undergoes an annual independent financial audit by a third party agency to verify IRS and 501(C)(3) compliance. Current and historical 990 tax filing information can be found on the Boot Campaign website. In 2024, 91 cents of every dollar donated to Boot Campaign went directly to the organization's programs for veterans and military families.

== Recognition ==
Boot Campaign is listed in four charity monitoring websites: Candid (formerly GuideStar), GreatNonprofits, CharityNavigator and BBB Wise Giving Alliance. Candid first reviewed Boot Campaign in 2011, and has awarded the organization a Platinum rating for commitment to transparency. GreatNonprofits has named Boot Campaign a Top Rated charity annually since 2013, which requires an organization to earn at least 10 four-star reviews each year. Boot Campaign has more than 150 reviews with an overall average rating of five stars. The organization received a 100 out of 100 rating by Charity Navigator for accountability and financial responsibility. BBB Wise Giving Alliance rates the organization as an "accredited" charity based on its 20 standards for recognition.

== History ==
Tyler, Texas orthodontist Sherri Reuland read "Lone Survivor,"Marcus Luttrell's account of Operation Red Wings, and was so moved by the story she recommended the book to four friends. Reuland, Ginger Giles, Heather Sholl, Leigh Ann Ranslem, and Mariae Bui borrowed combat boots for a photo project to show their support for troops and veterans asking Americans to "get their boots on" to show their support for the military.
