= Taya Kyle =

Widow of Chris Kyle (born 1974)

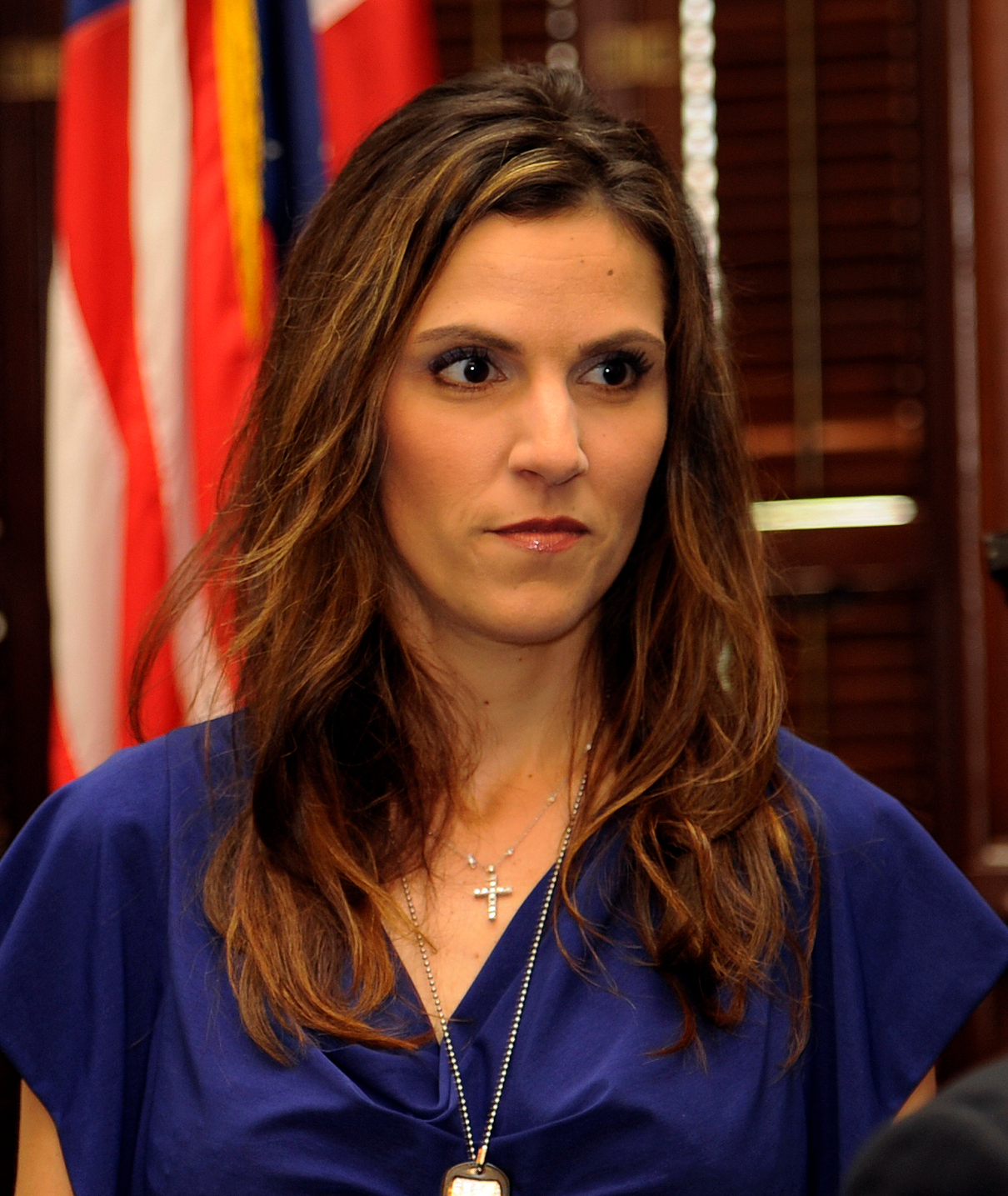
- Kyle in 2013
- Born: Taya Renae Studebaker; September 4, 1974 (age 52); Portland, Oregon, U.S.
- Occupations: Author; political commentator; activist
- Political party: Republican
- Spouse: Chris Kyle (m. 2002; died 2013)
- Children: 2

Taya Renae Kyle (née Studebaker; born September 4, 1974) is an American author, political commentator, and military veteran's family activist. Known as the widow of US Navy SEAL Chris Kyle, she was portrayed by actress Sienna Miller in the film American Sniper based on his autobiography of the same name. She is also the co-author of American Wife: A Memoir of Love, Service, Faith, and Renewal, a book about life with her husband.

== Early life ==
Born Taya Renae Studebaker on September 4, 1974, in Portland, Oregon, she is the daughter of Kim and Kent Studebaker. Her father previously served as the mayor of Lake Oswego, Oregon. Her older sister is Ashley (Studebaker) Brittell.

== Chris Kyle ==
Studebaker met Chris Kyle in 2001. They married in 2002 and later had two children.

As a Navy SEAL, Chris Kyle is known as the most lethal snipers in U.S. military history. His autobiography, American Sniper, was published on January 3, 2012. On February 2, 2013, he was shot and killed at a shooting range in Texas, making Taya a widow at age 38.

=== Life after Chris Kyle's death ===
In 2014, Kyle founded the Chris Kyle Frog Foundation as a touchstone for veterans and their families. The foundation's mission is to "serve those who serve us by providing meaningful interactive experiences that enrich family relationships".

In May 2013, former Minnesota governor Jesse Ventura brought a defamation suit against the estate of Chris Kyle, of which Taya was the executrix, for $1.3 million. The lawsuit was the continuation of an original lawsuit filed in 2012 against Kyle's husband, over a statement made in the book American Sniper. In the book's chapter titled "Punching Out Scruff Face", Chris Kyle stated he had punched a celebrity he called "Scruff Face" for saying the SEALs "could afford to lose a couple" in war. Ventura won the lawsuit in an 8 to 2 jury decision. An appeals court threw out part of the lawsuit in June 2016, and the case was ultimately settled out of court for an undisclosed amount of money.

Clint Eastwood directed the feature film American Sniper in 2014, based on the lives of Chris and Taya Kyle. Taya Kyle was involved in the making of the film, working with the film's screenwriter Jason Hall, and she was portrayed by Sienna Miller. The film, released by Warner Bros. Pictures nationwide in January 2015, was nominated for six Academy Awards, including Best Picture and Best Adapted Screenplay. It won the Academy Award for Best Sound Editing at the 87th Academy Awards.

== Publication of Taya Kyle's autobiography ==
On May 5, 2015, Taya Kyle's autobiography, American Wife: A Memoir of Love, Service, Faith, and Renewal, was released by HarperCollins publishing. Co-written with military and war author Jim DeFelice, the book details her life as a military wife and how she dealt with the sudden and untimely death of her husband.

== Other activities ==
In September 2015, she was a judge for the Miss America pageant.

In 2016, Kyle was featured in season 1, episode 5 of American Elements on CarbonTV.

Kyle was a contributor for Fox News.

In 2020, she unsuccessfully ran for Midlothian Independent School District Trustees.

In April 2024, Kyle debut children's picture book, Prayers for Bears: Bailey the Grateful Bear was published by Christian publishing house Fidelis Books.

== Politics ==
Taya is a Republican and endorsed Rick Perry in the 2016 presidential election. After Perry withdrew, she endorsed Ted Cruz. She also served as treasurer for the successful 2016 campaign of Bill Waybourn for Sheriff of Tarrant County, Texas.

In January 2016, she opined at a CNN Town Hall Event that the opposition to the NRA and adding more laws restricting gun ownership is not a solution to the gun violence in the United States.
