= Chris Kyle =

American sniper (1974–2013)

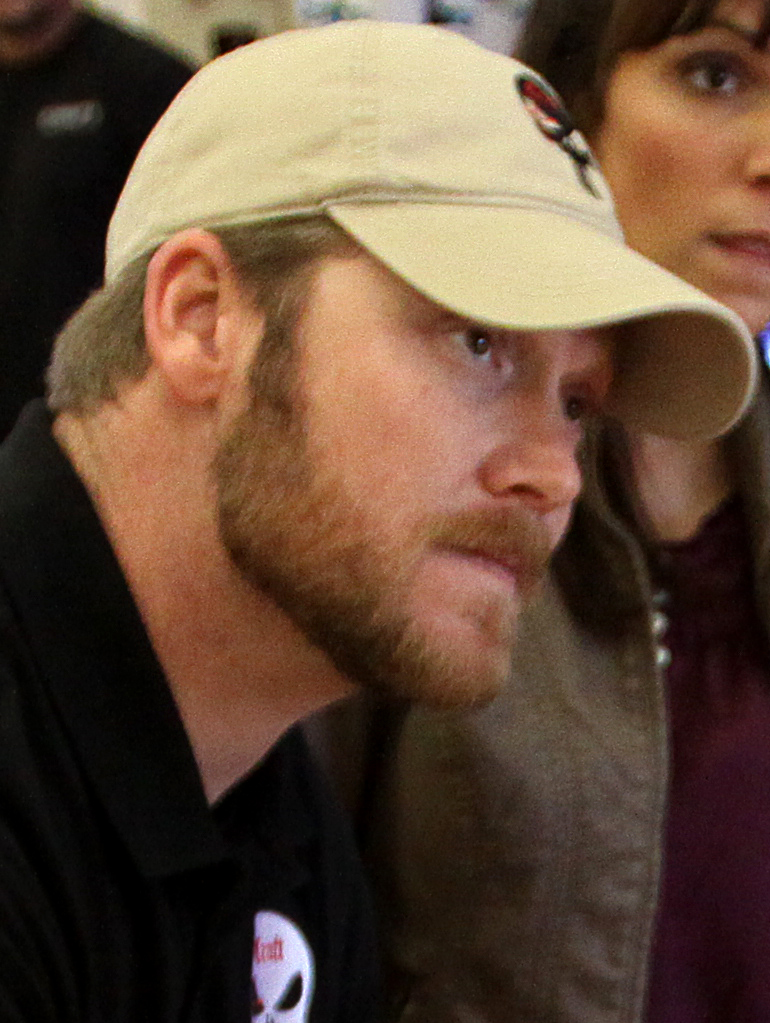
- Kyle in 2012
- Born: Christopher Scott Kyle; April 8, 1974; Odessa, Texas, U.S.
- Died: February 2, 2013 (aged 38); Erath County, Texas, U.S.
- Cause of death: Murder by gunshot
- Burial place: Texas State Cemetery
- Spouse: Taya Studebaker (m. 2002)
- Children: 2
- Military career
- Branch: United States Navy
- Service years: 1999–2009
- Rank: Chief Petty Officer (Rating: Special Warfare Operator, formerly Intelligence Specialist)
- Units: United States Navy SEALs; SEAL Team 3
- Conflicts: See battles: Iraq War; Invasion of Iraq; Battle of Al Faw; Battle of Nasiriyah; Second Battle of Fallujah; Second Battle of Ramadi; 2008 Iraq spring fighting; Siege of Sadr City
- Awards: Silver Star; Bronze Star Medal (3); Navy and Marine Corps Achievement Medal
- Other work: American Sniper (2012); American Gun (2013)

Signature
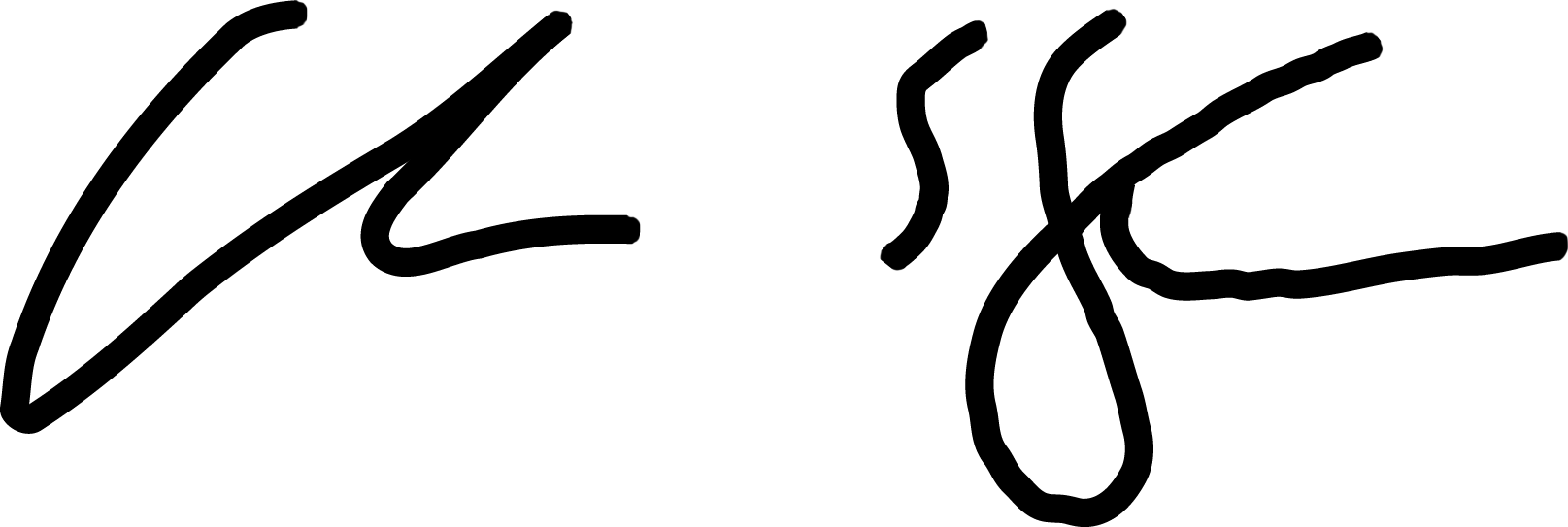

Christopher Scott Kyle (April 8, 1974 – February 2, 2013) was a United States Navy SEAL sniper and author. Kyle served four tours in the Iraq War. With a claim of 160 confirmed kills in combat, he is one of the most prolific snipers in military history. He was awarded one Silver Star and three Bronze Star medals with "V" devices for valor, in addition to three service medals.

Kyle was honorably discharged from the U.S. Navy in 2009, and published his bestselling autobiography, American Sniper, in 2012. His autobiography contains several incidents that are unverifiable or that appear to have been fabricated, including shootings in New Orleans and Dallas, and he was sued by Jesse Ventura for defamation. In 2013, Kyle was murdered by Eddie Ray Routh at the Rough Creek Lodge shooting range near Chalk Mountain, Texas. Routh, a former Marine, was found guilty and sentenced to life in prison with no possibility of parole. A film adaptation of Kyle's book, directed by Clint Eastwood, and starring Bradley Cooper as Kyle, was posthumously released in 2014.

== Early life and education ==
Christopher Scott Kyle was born on April 8, 1974, in Odessa, Texas, the elder of two boys born to Deborah Lynn (née Mercer) and Wayne Kenneth Kyle, a Sunday school teacher and deacon. His father bought Kyle his first rifle at the age of eight, a bolt-action .30-06 Springfield rifle, and later a shotgun, with which they hunted deer, pheasant, and quail. Kyle and his brother Jeff grew up raising up to 150 head of cattle at a time. Kyle attended high school in Midlothian, Texas, and after graduating in 1992, became a professional bronco rider and ranch hand, however his professional rodeo career ended abruptly when he severely injured his arm. He attended Tarleton State University for two years (1992–1994), studying Ranch and Range Management.

== Military career ==
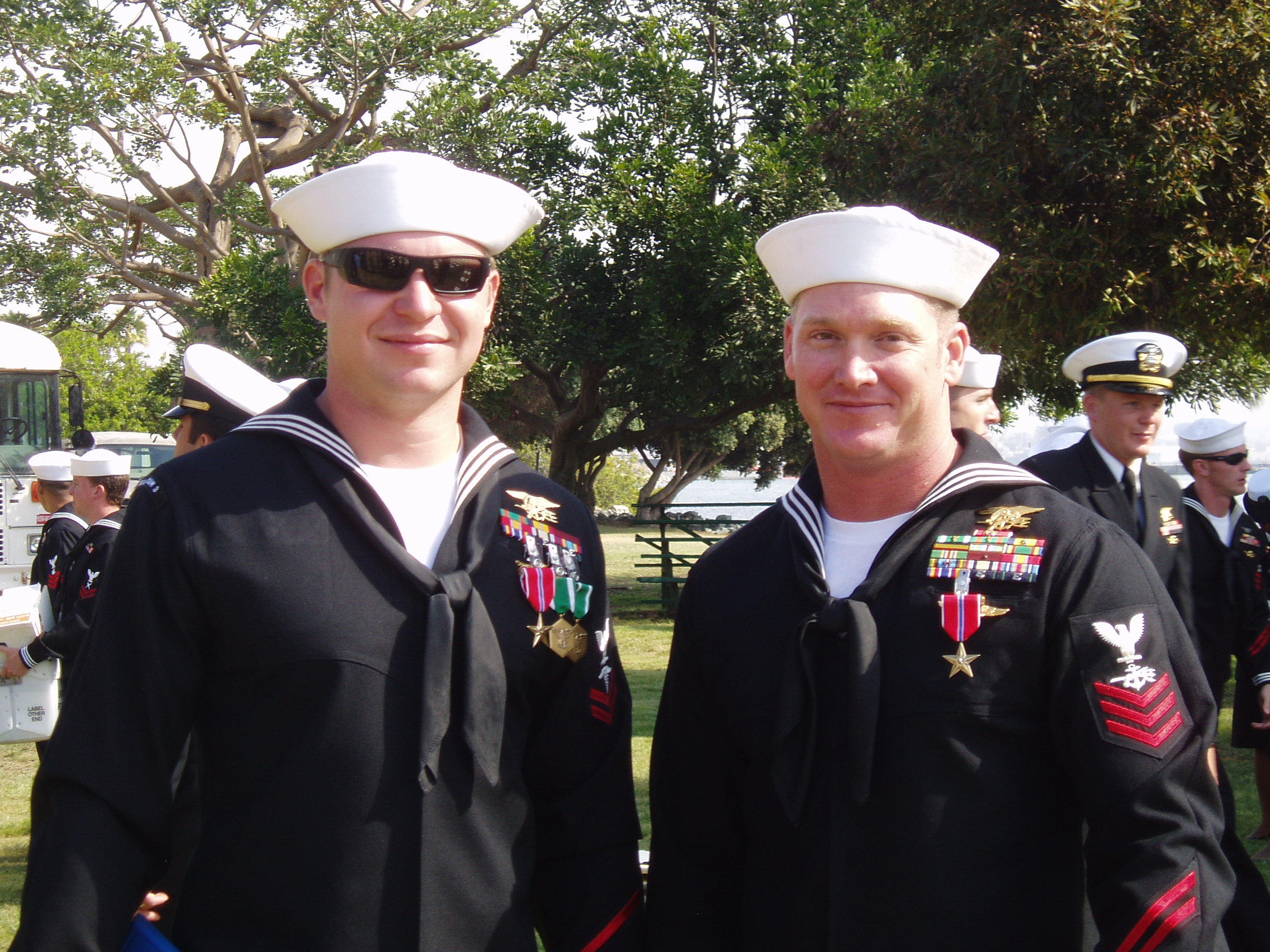
Chris Kyle (right) and Kevin Lacz (left) at a SEAL Team 3 awards ceremony in Coronado, CA, on October 7, 2007

Kyle went to a military recruiting office, as he was interested in joining the U.S. Marine Corps special operations. Instead, he was convinced by a U.S. Navy recruiter to try for the SEALs. He enlisted in the United States Navy on August 5, 1998, and began basic training on February 10, 1999. He graduated from basic training at Naval Station Great Lakes, Illinois, in April 1999. He attended additional training as an Intelligence Specialist at NMITC Dam Neck, Virginia, from April to July 1999, and at NPC Millington, Tennessee, from August 1999 to March 2000. Initially, Kyle was rejected because of the pins in his arm, but he eventually received an invitation to the 24-week Basic Underwater Demolition/Sea, Air, Land (SEAL) training (BUD/S) at NAB Coronado, California. Kyle graduated with Class 233 in March 2001, followed by SEAL Qualification Training (SQT) at NAB Coronado from May to August 2001. Assigned to SEAL Team-3, sniper element, Platoon "Charlie" (later "Cadillac"), within the Naval Special Warfare Command, and with four tours of duty, Kyle served in many major battles of the Iraq War. His first long-range kill shot was taken during the initial invasion when he shot a woman carrying a hand grenade approaching a group of Marines. CNN reported the woman was cradling a toddler in her other hand. As ordered, Kyle opened fire, killing the woman before she could attack.

=== Military sniper ===
Kyle proved to be an effective sniper in Iraq, with a large number of confirmed and unconfirmed kills. Kyle's shooter's statements (filled out by every sniper after a mission) were reported to higher command, who kept them in case any shootings were contested as outside the rules of engagement. The publisher HarperCollins states: "The Pentagon has officially confirmed more than 150 of Kyle's kills (the previous American record was 109), but it has declined to verify the total number for this book." In his autobiography, Kyle wrote:

The Navy credits me with more kills as a sniper than any other American service member, past or present. I guess that's true. They go back and forth on what the number is. One week, it's 160 (the 'official' number as of this writing, for what that's worth), then it's way higher, then it's somewhere in between. If you want a number, ask the Navy—you may even get the truth if you catch them on the right day.

On July 8, 2016, the U.S. Navy corrected Kyle's DD Form 214 regarding some decorations listed on his original discharge document. The original discharge papers issued to him upon leaving the service tally with the account given in his autobiography: two Silver Stars and five Bronze Stars with valor. The Navy revised it to one Silver Star and four Bronze Stars with valor. The Navy said "Kyle would have played no role in the production of his personnel files other than signing the DD-214 upon his discharge" and "[a]fter thoroughly reviewing all available records, the Navy determined an error was made" and "issued a corrected copy of the DD-214".

=== Weapons ===
While in training, Kyle used four different rifles in order to know which weapon was the most useful in the given situation. In the field, he used the following:

- a semi-automatic 7.62 NATO Mk 11 sniper rifle (patrol),
- a 5.56 NATO Mk 12 Designated Marksman Rifle modified with the lower receiver of an M4A1 to get a collapsible stock and allow full-auto fire (urban patrol),
- a Remington Model 700, later type classified as a MK13 Mod 1, .300 Winchester Magnum sniper rifle with McMillan stock and customized barrel, which was later replaced with a .300 Winchester Magnum Accuracy International,
- Various rifles chambered in .338 Lapua Magnum used for long-range shooting.

== Post-military life ==
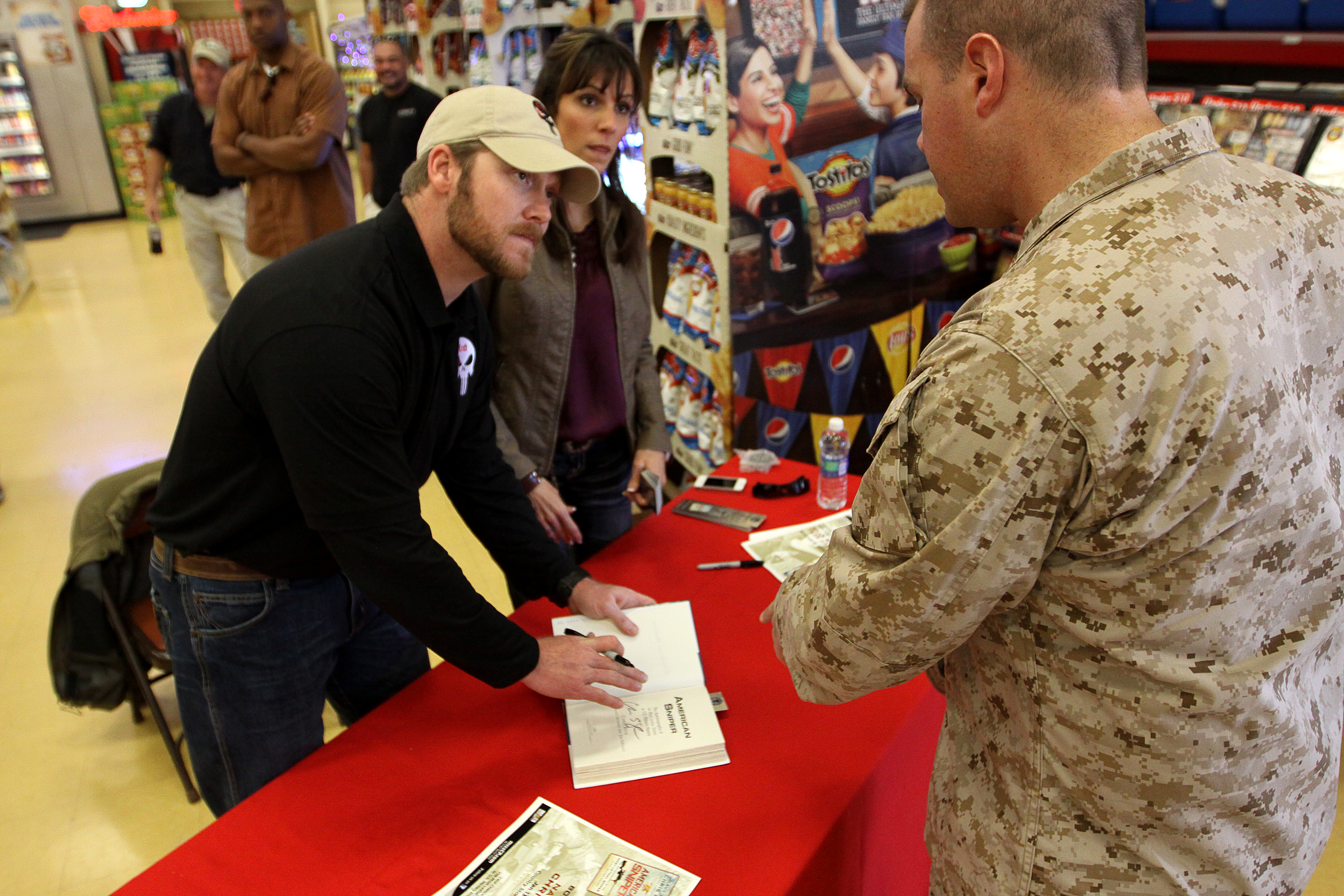
Kyle and his wife Taya in January 2012, signing autographs for his book American Sniper at Camp Pendleton

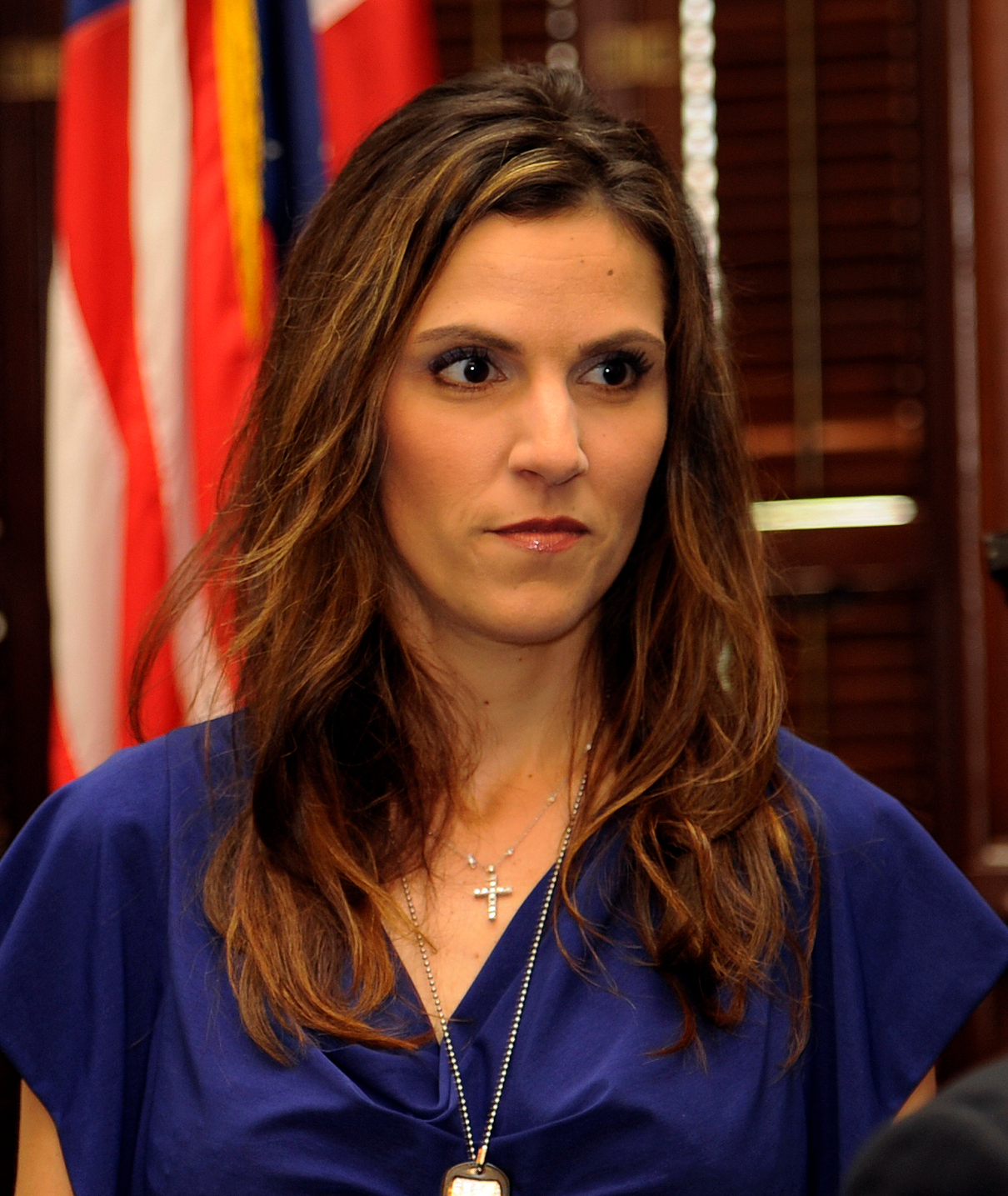
Taya Kyle in August 2013

Kyle left the U.S. Navy in 2009, and moved to Midlothian, Texas, with his wife, Taya, and two children. He was president of Craft International, a tactical training company for the U.S. military and law enforcement communities.

In 2012, HarperCollins released Kyle's autobiography, American Sniper. Kyle had initially hesitated to write the book but was persuaded to move forward because other books about SEALs were under way. In his book, Kyle wrote bluntly of his experiences. Of the battle for control of Ramadi, he says: "Force moved that battle. We killed the bad guys and brought the leaders to the peace table. That is how the world works." In the book and ensuing interviews, Kyle stated he had no regrets about his work as a sharpshooter, saying, "I had to do it to protect the Marines."

American Sniper had a 37-week run on The New York Times bestseller list and brought Kyle national attention. Following its release, media articles challenged some of Kyle's anecdotes, but the core of his narrative was widely accepted. "Tales of his heroism on the battlefield were already lore in every branch of the armed forces", writes Michael J. Mooney, author of a biography of Kyle.

Kyle paired with FITCO Cares Foundation, a nonprofit organization that created the Heroes Project to provide free in-home fitness equipment, individualized programs, personal training, and life-coaching to in-need veterans with disabilities, Gold Star families, or those with PTSD. On August 13, 2012, Kyle appeared on the reality television show Stars Earn Stripes, which featured celebrities pairing up with a Special Operations or law enforcement professional who trained them in weapons and combat tactics. Kyle was teamed with actor Dean Cain.

=== Jesse Ventura defamation lawsuit ===
In his book American Sniper, Kyle wrote a subchapter titled "Punching Out Scruff Face" about an alleged altercation in a bar. In the book, he claims he punched a man he refers to as "Scruff Face" for allegedly saying "You deserve to lose a few [guys]" and being critical of the Iraq war. According to Kyle, the encounter took place at McP's, a bar in Coronado, California, on October 12, 2006, during a wake for Kyle's comrade, Michael A. Monsoor, a U.S. Navy SEAL who had been killed in Iraq. Petty Officer Monsoor was posthumously awarded the Medal of Honor, on April 8, 2008, for his actions in support of Operation Iraqi Freedom on September 29, 2006. On January 4, 2012, Kyle appeared on Opie and Anthony to discuss his book. On the show, Kyle alleged the character "Scruff" in his book is former Governor of Minnesota Jesse Ventura.

Following the allegations, Ventura denied the incident had happened or having ever met Kyle. Ventura filed a lawsuit in January 2012 against Kyle for charges of defamation, appropriation, and unjust enrichment. After Kyle was killed the following year, the lawsuit was transferred to Kyle's estate. On July 29, 2014, the jury returned a recommendation of 8 to 2 that Kyle was liable to Ventura for defamation and unjust enrichment, but not appropriation. The jury concluded that the Kyle estate owed Ventura $500,000 for defamation, and $1.34 million for unjust enrichment. The district judge, who rendered the final judgement, said that there was "substantial evidence" that supported the jury verdict.

Kyle's widow appealed the verdict on behalf of Kyle's estate. Attorneys for Kyle's estate asked the appeals court to throw out the verdict or at least order a new trial because a lawyer for Ventura told jurors that the $1.8 million judgment would be paid for by Kyle's book publisher's insurance policy, not his estate. In June 2016, the U.S. Court of Appeals for the 8th Circuit threw out the $1.8 million in part due to the revelation of a non-relevant insurance policy by Ventura's attorneys to the jury. The $1.35 million in "unjust enrichment" was overturned and dismissed as being inconsistent with Minnesota law. The $500k defamation suit was remanded back to trial. In December 2017, the case was settled out of court for an undisclosed amount.

== Fabrications of personal narrative ==
In addition to the story of his attack on Jesse Ventura, Kyle claimed involvement in a number of incidents that were unverifiable, and that some sources have called into question, describing them as unlikely.

In 2013, The New Yorker reported that during a late-night drinking session, Kyle recounted driving to New Orleans after hearing about looting in the aftermath of Hurricane Katrina. He and another man allegedly brought sniper rifles and positioned themselves at a vantage point on top of the city's Louisiana Superdome. Kyle claimed the duo shot a number of armed civilians they identified as making trouble. According to the report, one of those present said Kyle claimed to have shot 30 people himself, another recollected Kyle asserting the two men had shot 30 people between them, and a third did not recall a specific number.

Kyle's Katrina story was widely discredited. There are no records of multiple shooting victims in the area around the Superdome. Military officials and former colleagues of Kyle reacted with skepticism when asked about his claim.

Kyle also claimed to have killed two men at a Dallas-area gas station in January 2009. He told one writer that the men attempted to rob him at gunpoint, but he drew his own weapon and shot them both in the chest. According to Kyle, the entire incident was on tape, and the police let him go after he gave them a number to call. He also asserted that he often received emails from police officers across the country thanking him for "cleaning up the streets".

The gas station story was also widely discredited. The stretch of highway where Kyle claimed the incident occurred passes through three counties; the sheriffs of each county definitively denied it had happened.

In 2016, the Navy clarified the number of medals Kyle was awarded during his military service. Kyle had claimed in his book that he was awarded two Silver Stars and five Bronze Stars. "Those numbers differed slightly from the Navy personnel form given to Kyle when he left the Navy in 2009. The form said he received two Silver Star and six Bronze Star medals with "V" devices." At that time, the Navy also noted that this form given to Kyle on his retirement was not accurate, and he had actually been awarded one Silver Star and four Bronze Star medals with "V" devices for valor.

Kyle wrote in his autobiography that the Navy credited him with 160 sniper kills. However, the Navy did not confirm or deny. The Navy's numbers also would be of "confirmed kills," the kills that are able to be confirmed on the battlefield. Kyle stated that the Navy's numbers varied from time to time.

== Murder ==
On February 2, 2013, Kyle and his friend, Chad Littlefield, 35, were shot and killed by Eddie Ray Routh at the Rough Creek Ranch-Lodge-Resort shooting range in Erath County, Texas. Both Kyle and Littlefield were armed with .45-caliber 1911-style pistols when they were murdered, but neither gun had been unholstered or fired, and the safety catches were still on. Kyle was murdered with a .45-caliber pistol, while Littlefield was shot with a 9 mm SIG Sauer pistol. Both guns belonged to Kyle.

Routh was a 25-year-old U.S. Marine Corps veteran from Lancaster, Texas. Kyle and Littlefield had taken Routh to the gun range. Routh had been in and out of mental hospitals for at least two years and had been diagnosed with schizophrenia. On the way to the shooting range, Kyle texted Littlefield, "This dude is straight-up nuts." Littlefield responded, "Watch my six", military slang meaning "watch my back". Four months later, while in his jail cell, Routh shared with former Erath County Sheriff's Deputy Gene Cole: "I was just riding in the back seat of the truck, and nobody would talk to me. They were just taking me to the range, so I shot them. I feel bad about it, but they wouldn't talk to me. I'm sure they've forgiven me."

After the murders, Routh went to his sister's house in Midlothian and told her what he had done. His sister, Laura Blevins, called 911 and told the emergency operator: "They went out to a shooting range ... Like, he's all crazy. He's ... psychotic." Local police captured Routh after a short freeway chase, which ended when Routh, who fled the scene in Kyle's Ford F-350 truck, crashed into a police cruiser in Lancaster.

Routh was arraigned later that same day on two counts of capital murder, and was taken to the Erath County Jail for holding under a $3 million bond. His trial was set to begin May 5, 2014, but was delayed to allow more time to comply with DNA testing requirements. The trial began on February 11, 2015. On February 24, 2015, Routh was found guilty of murdering Kyle and Littlefield. The jury returned the verdict after less than three hours of deliberations. Since prosecutors decided beforehand not to seek the death penalty, the trial judge, Jason Cashon, immediately sentenced Routh to life in prison with no possibility of parole. Routh is imprisoned at the Texas Department of Criminal Justice Ramsey Unit in Rosharon, Texas.

A memorial service was held for Kyle at Cowboys Stadium in Arlington, Texas, on February 11, and he was buried on February 12, 2013, at the Texas State Cemetery in Austin, after the funeral cortege journeyed from Midlothian to Austin, more than 200 miles (320 km). Hundreds of people, many waving American flags, lined Interstate 35 to view the passing procession and to pay their final respects to Kyle.

== Legacy ==
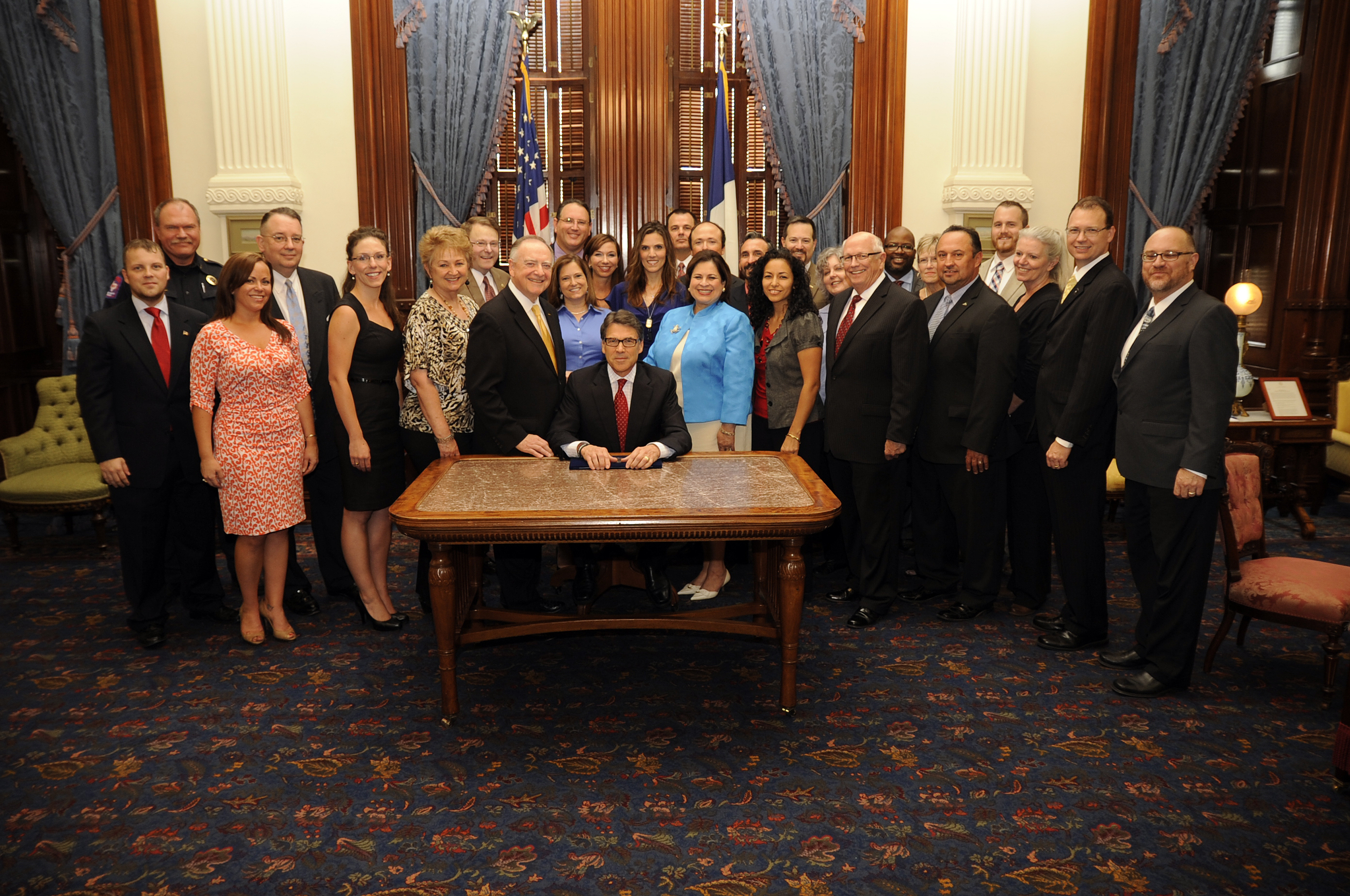
The signing of the "Chris Kyle Bill" at the Texas State Capitol in August 2013

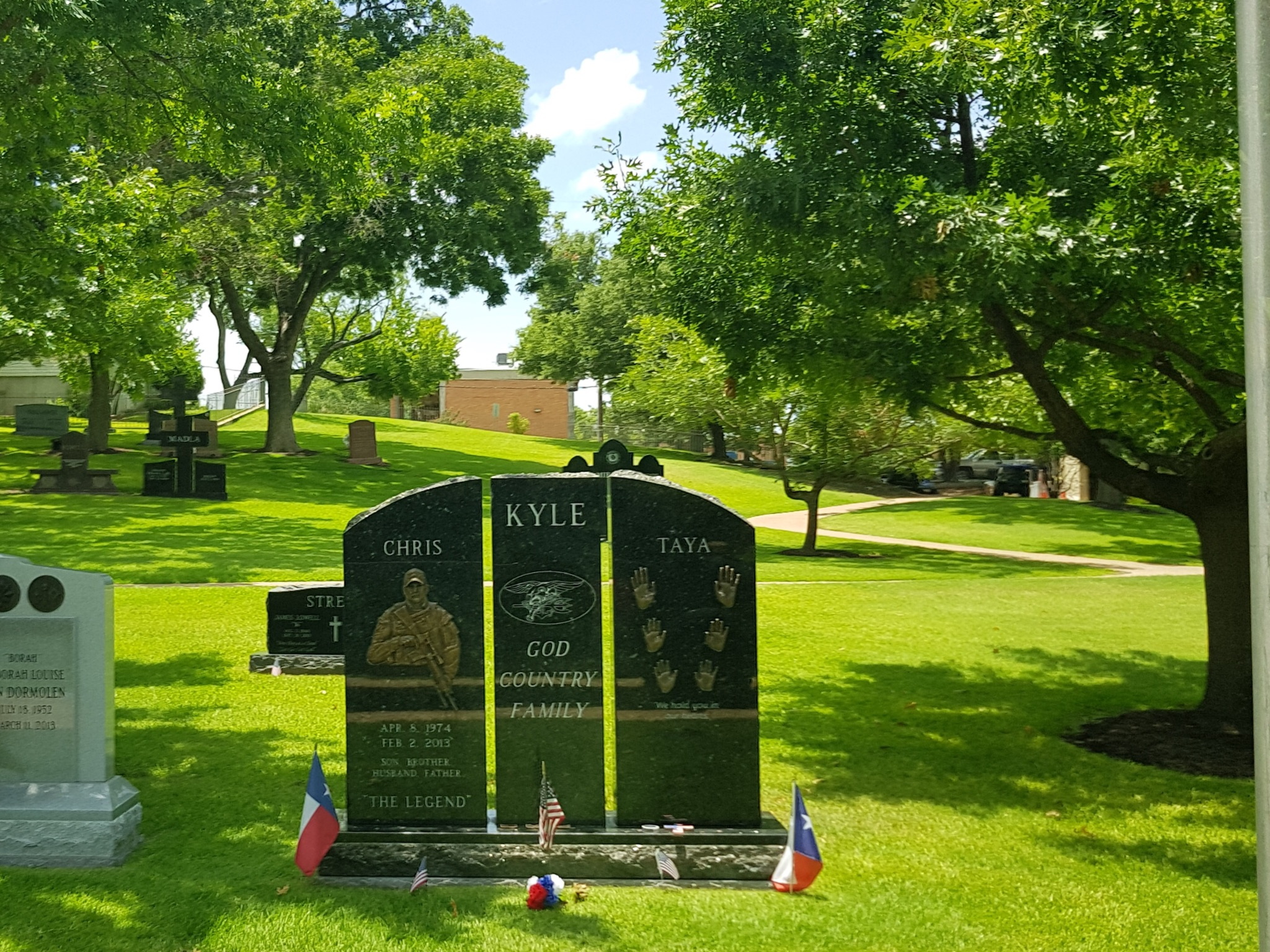
Kyle's tombstone at the Texas State Cemetery in August 2018

In August 2013, Texas governor Rick Perry signed Senate Bill 162, also known as the "Chris Kyle Bill", to recognize military training in the issuance of occupational licenses. The bill had been co-sponsored by Republican Representative Dan Flynn of Van and Democratic Senator Leticia Van de Putte of San Antonio. The ceremony was attended by Kyle's widow Taya.

Sculptor Greg Marra created a memorial statue of Kyle for presentation to his widow. Fundraising for production of the statue was provided by members of the Tea Party movement.

In 2013, a Texas teacher, Dana Morris, attempted to get a section of Highway 75 through Dallas named after Chris Kyle, but was unsuccessful. In 2015, Morris made another attempt to get a road named after Chris Kyle and Chad Littlefield. During the 84th Texas Legislative Session HB 1187 was introduced by Representative John Wray (R) from Ellis County due to the efforts of Dana Morris' grassroots efforts to show her students that they did have a voice in their government. The bill was co-sponsored by 53 Republican congressional leaders. Littlefield's name was removed from the original bill due to his widow's wishes. The bill was changed to only reflect Chris Kyle's name. A twin bill HB 3, put forth in the Senate by Senator Brian Birdwell in case HB 1187, did not pass the Texas House vote. On May 20, 2015, HB 1187 passed both the House and Senate. The Chris Kyle Memorial Highway Bill was signed into law by Governor Greg Abbott on June 3, 2015, in Dallas, Texas. Abbott said to Morris, "this was a great project for students and will leave a fundamental legacy in their learning about government." The law became official September 1, 2015. On February 16, 2016, signs for the 11 mile stretch of Highway 287 through Midlothian, Texas, were unveiled. A subsequent bill was passed in 2018 to name a plaza and road after Chris Kyle in the town where he was raised, Midlothian, Texas.

Clint Eastwood's film American Sniper (2014) is based on Kyle's autobiography. Kyle is portrayed by Bradley Cooper, and his wife Taya Kyle is portrayed by Sienna Miller. For his portrayal of Kyle, Cooper received an Academy Award nomination for Best Actor, and the film was nominated in five other categories, including Best Picture. The film won the Academy Award for Best Sound Editing.

On February 2, 2015, exactly two years after Kyle's murder, Texas Governor Greg Abbott declared the day "Chris Kyle Day". A privately funded memorial for Kyle, built in Odessa, Texas, was unveiled on July 28, 2016. It includes a plaza and a bronze statue.

== Awards and decorations ==
The Navy revised Chris Kyle's list of awards on June 14, 2016.

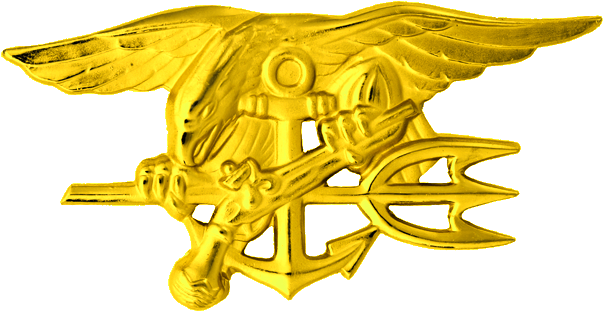

=== Silver Star Citation ===
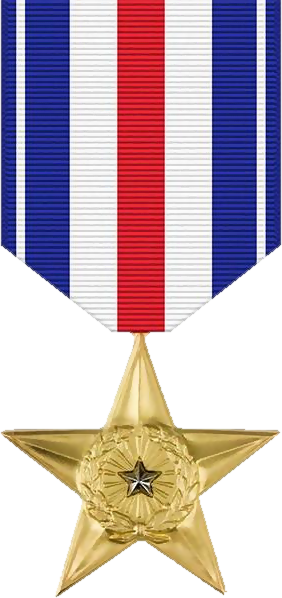

Citation:

The President of the United States of America takes pleasure in presenting the Silver Star to Special Warfare Operator First Class (SEAL) Christopher Scott Kyle, United States Navy, for conspicuous gallantry and intrepidity in action against the enemy while serving as Lead Sniper while assigned to Naval Special Warfare Task Unit-RAMADI in direct support of Operation IRAQI FREEDOM from 24 April to 27 August 2006. Petty Officer Kyle's heroic actions, professionalism and incredible sniper skills had tremendous impact in the success of U.S. and Iraqi Forces in routing the insurgency and seizing key areas of the City of Ar Ramadi, the epicenter of Al Qaeda and insurgent activity in Iraq. During 32 sniper overwatch missions, he personally accounted for 91 confirmed enemy fighters killed and dozens more probably killed or wounded. Petty Officer Kyle's efforts were integral to the success of four U.S. Army and Marine Corps Battalion Task Force operations, establishing U.S. and Iraqi Army combat outposts in previously insurgent-held areas. His engagements directly prevented casualties to U.S. and Iraqi Forces on more than 30 occasions, including enemy rocket-propelled grenade and mortar teams eliminated, five enemy snipers with scoped weapons eliminated, and dozens of insurgent fighters destroyed while actively engaging U.S. and Iraqi forces with small arms. By his bold leadership, courageous actions, and total dedication to duty, Petty Officer Kyle reflected great credit upon himself and upheld the highest traditions of the United States Naval Service.

== See also ==
- List of United States Navy SEALs
- List of snipers
- Longest recorded sniper kills

== Bibliography ==
- Kyle, Chris; McEwen, Scott; DeFelice, Jim (2013). American Sniper: The Autobiography of the Most Lethal Sniper in U.S. Military History. New York: W. Morrow, 2012. ISBN 0-062-08235-3 OCLC 733224029
- Kyle, Chris; Doyle, William (2013). American Gun: A History of the U.S. in Ten Firearms. New York: William Morrow, 2013. ISBN 0-0622-4271-7 OCLC 813286737

== Interviews ==
- Bannister, Matthew; Kyle, Chris (May 1, 2012). "Today, former US Navy Seal sniper Chris Kyle was responsible for 150 officially confirmed deaths in his ten-year military career". Outlook. BBC World Service.
- Jarkesy, George; Noon, Marita; Kyle, Chris (March 5, 2012). "Marita Noon – Author of 'Energy Freedom' – and Chris Kyle 'American Sniper' – Join for Military Monday". The George Jarkesy Radio Show.
- Slen, Peter; Kyle, Chris (April 7, 2012). "Book Discussion on American Sniper". Book TV. C-SPAN.
