= Chalk Mountain, Texas =

- Unincorporated community
- Location within the state of Texas Chalk Mountain (the United States)
- Coordinates: 32°09′16″N 97°54′39″W
- Country: United States
- State: Texas
- County: Erath
- Elevation: 1,204 ft (367 m)
- Time zone: UTC-6 (Central (CST))
  - Summer (DST): UTC-6 (CDT)
- ZIP code: 76649
- Area code: 254
- GNIS feature ID: 1332619

Chalk Mountain is a small unincorporated community in Erath County, Texas, United States. It lies along U.S. Route 67 near the Somervell County line, approximately 12 miles southwest of Glen Rose. In 2009, Chalk Mountain was the site of a meteorite hoax.

== Climate ==
The climate in this area is characterized by hot, humid summers and generally mild to cool winters. According to the Köppen Climate Classification system, Chalk Mountain has a humid subtropical climate, abbreviated "Cfa" on climate maps.

== Meteorite hoax ==
In May 2009 Manfred Cuntz, a professor of physics and the director of the astronomy program at the University of Texas at Arlington, was called in to investigate a supposed meteorite impact. Cuntz along with other experts, a Fox TV crew and the property owner met at the site. They found a refrigerator-sized gray-white rock at the end of a trench. A few smashed trees were nearby, but no signs of burning could be seen. Arthur Ehlmann, a professor of geology at the Texas Christian University and an expert in meteoric research, chipped off a piece of the stone and pronounced it to be made of limestone, which was plentiful in the area. Generally, meteorites are not composed of limestone. Local newspapers, TV and the Texas Mutual UFO network sensationalized the story trying to explain how it could be a meteorite despite its composition, lack of burning as it would have had if it zipped through the atmosphere. A meteorite of this size would have "caused widespread devastation", yet nothing of this sort occurred. Later on, Cuntz received an email that linked the property owner to being the owner of an earth-moving equipment company. His website mentioned that their equipment could move rock of any size. Cuntz made the Fox TV station aware of his conclusion that this meteorite impact was probably a hoax, and the TV station took the news clip off their website.

== Notable person ==
- Jerry Naylor, recording artist, disc jockey, and television and radio personality

== Bibliography ==
- T. Lindsay Baker, Ghost Towns of Texas (Norman: University of Oklahoma Press, 1986).
- Vallie Eoff, A History of Erath County, Texas (M.A. thesis, University of Texas, 1937).
