= List of accidents and incidents involving military aircraft (1940–1942) =

This is a list of accidents and incidents involving military aircraft grouped by the year in which the accident or incident occurred. Not all of the aircraft were in operation at the time. Combat losses are not included, except for a few cases denoted by singular circumstances.

== Aircraft terminology ==
Information on aircraft gives the type, and if available, the serial number of the operator in italics, the constructors number, also known as the manufacturer's serial number (c/n), exterior codes in apostrophes, nicknames (if any) in quotation marks, flight callsign in italics, and operating units.

== 1940 ==
5 January
The early models of the Henschel Hs 129 suffer from heavy stick forces, amongst other problems, and on this date the Hs 129 V2 is destroyed when it fails to pull out of a dive.
6 January
Bell XP-39B Airacobra, 38–326, modified from prototype XP-39, on test flight out of Buffalo, New York, suffers failure of main gear legs to retract fully, stopping 18 inches (460 mm) short of flush stowage. Pilot, Wright Field P-39 project officer George Price, saves prototype with deft belly-landing, damage mostly limited to the propeller.

10 January
The Mechelen Incident, also known as the Mechelen affair, was an event during the Phoney War in the first stages of World War II. A German Messerschmitt Bf 108 Taifun, D-NFAW, piloted by Major Erich Hoenmanns, 52, base commander of Loddenheide airfield, near Münster with an officer, Major Helmuth Reinberger, on-board carrying the plans for Fall Gelb (Case Yellow), a German attack on the Low Countries, becomes lost and crash-lands in neutral Belgium near Vucht, in the modern-day municipality of Maasmechelen. This prompts an immediate crisis in the Low Countries and amidst the French and British authorities, whom the Belgians notify of their discovery; however the crisis abates relatively quickly once the dates mentioned in the plans pass without incident. It has been argued that the incident led to a major change in the German attack plan, but this hypothesis has also been disputed.

3 February
US Army Air Corps Chief of Staff Gen. Henry H. Arnold's personal staff transport, Northrop A-17AS, 36–350, c/n 290, 3-seat command transport, written off in accident this date.

3 February
RAF pilot Peter Townsend, flying a Hawker Hurricane of 43 Squadron, downs Heinkel He 111, Werke Nummer 3232, 1H+FM, of Kampfgeschwader 26 (KG 26), on a shipping strike, piloted by Hermann Wilms, which crashlands near Bannial Flat farm, Whitby, the first German aircraft downed on English soil since a Gotha bomber at Harrietsham, Kent, on 18 May 1918. (Previous German aircraft had been downed during World War II, but in Scotland.) Luftwaffe observer Peter Leushake on the He 111 killed by gunnery, gunner and flight engineer Johann Meyer, gunner Unteroffizier Karl Missy both wounded.
7 February
First Finnish loss of a Fiat G.50 Freccia occurs when FA-8 is destroyed in an accident. Sergeant Asser Wallenius forgets to open the main fuel tanks valve prior to take- off from Västerås Sweden. He crashes into trees and is severely injured. The plane is a total loss.
10 February
First British Consolidated PBY Catalina, P9630 Consolidated 28-5, ex-NX21732, the sole Consolidated Model 28-5, sinks in a landing accident at Dumbarton after a flight from Rhu. Although salvaged, it never flies again.

15 February
Hawker Hector army co-operation biplane, the end of the Hawker Hart line, K9731, 'ZR-N', of No. 613 Squadron RAF, suffers engine problem on take-off from RAF Odiham, buries nose in an earthen berm.

20 February
First fatal accident involving a Saro Lerwick flying boat occurs when Flt. Sgt. Corby attempts landing of L7253 of No. 209 Squadron RAF (209 Sqn) off Lismore Island near Oban in poor visibility. Aircraft stalls, bounces on water several times, starboard wingtip float breaks off, airframe capsizes. Water pours into hull through open windows, pilot Corby drowns but body recovered, three crew missing, two survive. Salvaged, becomes instructional airframe, later sinks in gale at RAF Wig Bay on Loch Ryan.

11 March
Second prototype Mitsubishi Navy Experimental 12-Shi Carrier Fighter, built at the Nagoya aircraft works of Mitsubishi Heavy Industries, equipped with a Mitsubishi Zuisei 13 engine, disintegrates at about 1030 hrs. during a dive test, flying out of Oppama Airfield (Yokosuka, Kanagawa), Japan. Pilot Masumi Okuyama of the flight test division of the Aeronautical Establishment is seen to deploy his chute, but then, inexplicably, releases harness and is killed by fall from height of 300 m (980 ft). Crash is determined to have been caused by tail flutter due to missing mass balance weight on elevator. The new design enters service named after the end of the year Kigen 2600 as the Mitsubishi Navy Type 0 Carrier Fighter Model 11. This was the first fatality in the type.

3 April
Pilot Lt. James W. Phelps. Jr. is killed while engaged in wargames near Cleveland, Ohio, when his Seversky P-35, 36-399, of the 94th Pursuit Squadron, 1st Pursuit Group, from Selfridge Field, Michigan, comes down hard.

5 April
Prototype SNCASE SE.100-01 crashes at Marignane, France, returning from test flight. Approaching field, gear down, flaps up, it is seen to execute a flat turn at 1,000 ft (300 m), sink abruptly and crash. Unprotected fuel tanks in fuselage belly rupture, pilot Rouland and his mechanic perish in fire. Starboard propeller pitch mechanism inadvertently went into reverse on power increase causing loss of control.

7 April
Blackburn B-20, V8914, experimental flying-boat with retractable lower-hull, lost after suffering severe aileron flutter – 3 crew killed, 2 rescued by HMS Transylvania. The aircraft's wreck still exists, but remains undisturbed as it is designated a War grave. In 1998, one of the engines was raised as it had been caught in a fishing boat's nets and dragged away from the wreck, into shallower water. It is currently an exhibit in the Dumfries and Galloway Aviation Museum.

11 April
Grumman XF4F-2 Wildcat prototype, BuNo 0383, c/n 356, suffers engine failure during test flight out of NAS Anacostia, Washington, D.C., force lands causing considerable damage. Aircraft grounded for several weeks for repairs.

16 April
The sole prototype Kimura HK-1 tailless glider, purchased by the Japanese Army, crashes this date after only 13 flights.

24 April
Heinkel He 177A V3, wrk. nr. 0000003, D-AGIG, is destroyed in a crash this date. Cause is traced to faulty trimming of the aircraft.

27 April
Prototype Yakovlev I-26, first of what became the Yak-1 fighter, crashes, killing pilot Yu. I. Piontkovskiy. The investigation of the crash found that the pilot performed two consecutive barrel rolls at low altitude which was in violation of test flight plan. It was believed that during the first roll, the main landing gear became unlocked, causing it to crash through the wing during the second roll. It has been theorized that Piontkovskiy's deviation from the flight plan was caused by frustration that his aircraft was being used for engine testing while I-26-2, built with the lessons of I-26-1 in mind, was already performing aerobatics.

9 May
First prototype Hawker Tornado, P5219, suffers a failure in the monocoque structure just forward of the cockpit while in flight. Test pilot Philip G. Lucas manages to land damaged fighter safely, is awarded the George Medal. Airframe repaired, flying again a month later.

26 May
As the British Expeditionary Force retreats to the French coast in the face of German advances, a flight of obsolescent Hawker Hector army co-operation biplanes of No. 613 Squadron RAF is dispatched from RAF Hawkinge at 0950 hrs., each armed with 2 X 120 lb. general purpose (GP) bombs, to support the Calais garrison trapped in the town's Citadel. Over the channel, Plt. Off. Bernard Brown, flying Hector K8111, with gunner LAC R. V. Brown, test-fires his front gun but after a few rounds the muzzle explodes, holing his fuel tank. He jettisons his bombs and attempts to return to Hawkinge, but runs out of fuel and force-lands on Herne Bay golf course.

1 June
First Douglas R3D-1 for the U.S. Navy, BuNo 1901, c/n 606, crashes at Mines Field, Los Angeles, California, before delivery. The Navy later acquires the privately owned DC-5 prototype, c/n 411, from William E. Boeing as a replacement.

7 June
Edgar James "Cobber" Kain, the RAF's top ace (17 confirmed kills during the Battle of France), due to return to England after a combat tour in France this date, is seen off from the airfield at Échemines by squadron mates who bid him farewell as he takes off in his Hurricane to fly to Le Mans to collect his kit. Unexpectedly, Kain begins a "beat-up" of the airfield, performing a series of low level aerobatics in Hawker Hurricane Mk. I, L1826. Commencing a series of "flick" rolls, on his third roll, the ace misjudges his altitude and hits the ground heavily in a level attitude. Kain dies when he is pitched out of the cockpit, striking the ground 27 m in front of the exploding Hurricane. Kain is buried in Choloy Military Cemetery.
10 June
An ex-U.S. Navy Curtiss SBC-4 Helldiver being flown from the Curtiss plant at Buffalo to an intermediate stop at Albany, New York, crashes in bad weather near Mariaville Lake late this date, killing pilot Allan B. Lullman, of St. Louis. The airframe, one of 50 slated for delivery to France, was en route to Canada for overseas shipment out of Halifax aboard the French aircraft carrier Béarn. The fall of France before delivery diverts Béarn to Forte du France, Martinique, Lesser Antilles, where she rides out the first part of the war. The 112 aircraft she carries are put ashore where they go to ruin.

17 June
Two twin-engine Douglas B-18A Bolo bombers, 37-576, piloted by 1st Lt. P. Burlingame, and 37-583, flown by 2d Lt. R. M. Bylander, of the 9th Bomb Group, were flying out of Mitchel Field, New York, on a training exercise. While maneuvering at 2,500 feet, one plane passed too close under the other and the two collided. Fuel, metal, glass and other debris rained down onto newly built homes in Bellerose, New York, killing all 11 crew on board. One woman, inside a home set afire, succumbed to burn injuries the next day.

21 June
Seventh (of 13 ordered) Bell YFM-1 Airacuda, 38–492, crash lands in farmer's field at East Aurora, New York, before acceptance by U.S. Army Air Corps when aircraft will not recover from spin, rudder locks, pilot cuts power prior to bail-out. After Bell test pilot Brian Sparks departs airframe, suffering severe injuries (two broken legs) when he strikes vertical fin and horizontal stabilizer, fellow Bell pilot John Strickler regains rudder control, dead-sticks the pusher twin into field ~15 SE of Buffalo. Sparks parachutes down, Strickler uninjured, airframe written-off.

27 June
The second prototype Heinkel He 177A V2, wrk. nr. 0000002, CB+RQ, suffers in flight break up from control flutter. Test pilot Rickert and three crew fail to bail out and are killed. The tail surfaces of the third, fourth and fifth prototypes nearing completion are then enlarged.

29 June
209 Sqn loses a second Saro Lerwick flying boat, L7261, when Flg. Off. Pain returns to Oban from escort mission due to severe weather. While taxying cross wind to the moorings, the starboard float breaks loose, flying boat capsizes, sinking within 30 minutes at RAF Oban in Ardantrive Bay. Airframe is beached four days later and salvage operations begin, but L7261 never flies again.

30 June
French Glenn Martin 167, aircraft No.4, from Casablanca to Gibraltar, is shot down by Spanish anti-aircraft fire. Four Frenchmen, Captain Vendeuvre, Lt. Weill, Lt Berger and Lt. Plessix killed.

9 July
During shakedown cruise of the aircraft carrier USS Wasp off Cuba, one of her Vought SB2U-2 Vindicator scout bombers, BuNo 1358, crashes two miles (3 km) from the ship. Wasp goes to flank speed to close, as does the plane-guarding destroyer USS Morris. The latter's boats recover items from the plane's baggage compartment, but the plane sinks with its two crew.

11 July
On its fifth test flight, the prototype Vought XF4U-1 Corsair, BuNo 1443, runs low on fuel, Vought test pilot Boone Guyton attempts landing on rain-slicked fairway of the Norwich, Connecticut, golf course, crashes into woods, flips over, slides into tree stump, comes to rest in ravine with wing and empennage torn off, propeller damage, but pilot unhurt. Vought rebuilds wreck to airborne condition in two months.

Night of 22/23 July
First-ever combat victory using airborne radar takes place when Fg. Off. Glynn Ashfield, Plt. Off. Geoffrey Morris and Sgt. Reginald Leyland in a Bristol Blenheim, intercept and down a Luftwaffe Dornier Do 17Z in the English Channel off Brighton.

6 August
Bell XP-39B Airacobra, 38–326, suffers second landing accident when pilot Capt. Ernest K. Warburton, chief of the Wright Field test unit, on his third landing attempt, pulls back power as he approaches Wright Field, Ohio, at ~106 mph (171 km/h), stalls, and hits ground harder than intended. "The wing structure yielded where the main gear attached, damaging the wing and integral fuel tanks. Damage proved more substantial than first thought. As it turned out, this was the last flight of the XP-39B. Paper work was submitted to survey the airframe 11 days later and final approval was received 27 December 1940. (Air Corps record card for XP-39B, serial number 38-326.) The prototype Airacobra was scrapped."

8 August
A Heinkel He 111H-4 of 1 Gruppe of Kampfgeschwader 4 (1/KG4), based at Soesterberg, the Netherlands, on a mission to lay mines off Belfast, crashes when the crew becomes lost and collides with the summit of Cairnsmore of Fleet in the Galloway Hills of Scotland, whereupon the ordnance on board explodes, killing the crew. KWF are Leutnant A. Zeiss, 25, Unteroffizier G. T. Von Turckheim, 31, Unteroffizier W. Hajesch, 21, and Unteroffizier W. Mechsner, 23. All crew are buried at Cannock Chase German war cemetery, Staffordshire, England. One of the Junkers Jumo 211 engines is displayed at the Dumfries and Galloway Aviation Museum.

13 August

Three members of the Australian cabinet, the Chief of the Australian Army's General Staff and six other passengers and aircrew were killed when Lockheed Hudson II, A16-97, which they were travelling in crashed in hilly country about 8 miles from Canberra.

26 August

Luftwaffe Dornier Do 17Z-2, Werke Nummer 1160, 5K+AR, of 7 Staffel, III Gruppe, Kampfgeschwader 3, is hit by Boulton-Paul Defiants of No. 264 (Madras Presidency) Squadron RAF, that leave both engines dead and the crew wounded while over Kent during a raid to attack airfields in Essex in the Battle of Britain. Attempts a wheels-up low-tide landing on the Goodwin Sands in the English Channel, according to records obtained by the BBC, sinking to a depth of 50 feet, coming to rest inverted in the Sands off the coast of Deal, Kent. Two of the crew members die on impact, while two others, including the pilot, Feldwebel (Flt. Sgt.) Willi Effmert, are taken prisoner and survive the war. Hidden and preserved by shifting sands, the discovery of the rare bomber is announced 3 September 2010. The airframe was initially found in 2008 when a fishing boat snagged nets on it. In March 2011 sonar images are taken by high-tech sonar equipment, undertaken by a Port of London Authority (PLA) vessel. High-resolution images appear to show that the Do 17, known as the "Flying Pencil", suffered only minor damage, to its forward cockpit and observation windows, and propellers, on impact. "The bomb bay doors were open, suggesting the crew jettisoned their cargo," said Port of London Authority spokesman Martin Garside. As the only known survivor of the type, and in a remarkable state of preservation, the Royal Air Force Museum has launched an appeal to raise funds for the lifting operation of the Dornier 17. In May 2013, the RAF Museum is on site, assembling a special lift to raise the airframe from the seabed, which attempt will probably take place in June. The wings will then be demated from the fuselage and the components moved for chemical stabilization and preservation, a lengthy process expected to cost about a half million pounds. The Ministry of Defence is responsible for the investigation of all military aircraft crash sites in the United Kingdom (including those situated in UK territorial waters) and has only issued a licence for recovery of the Dornier because it is NOT a war grave. The aircraft's crew of four are all accounted for and no human remains are present in the aircraft.

28 August
On 28 August 1940 Mr. E.G.R. Russell-Stracey, a Hawker test pilot, is killed when his Hurricane Mk II, Z2340, suffered engine failure on taking off for its first flight. At this time Hawker Hurricanes were being made by Vickers Armstrong at their factory in Weybridge, built on the site of the Brooklands race track, now a museum.

29 August
A Grumman F3F-2, BuNo 0976, c/n 374, '2-MF-16', ditches off the coast of San Diego while attempting a landing on USS Saratoga, when pilot, Marine 1st Lieutenant Robert E. Galer, a future general and Medal of Honor recipient, has fuel pump issues. The fighter is rediscovered by a navy submersible in June 1988, and recovered on 5 April 1991. It was restored at the San Diego Aerospace Museum.

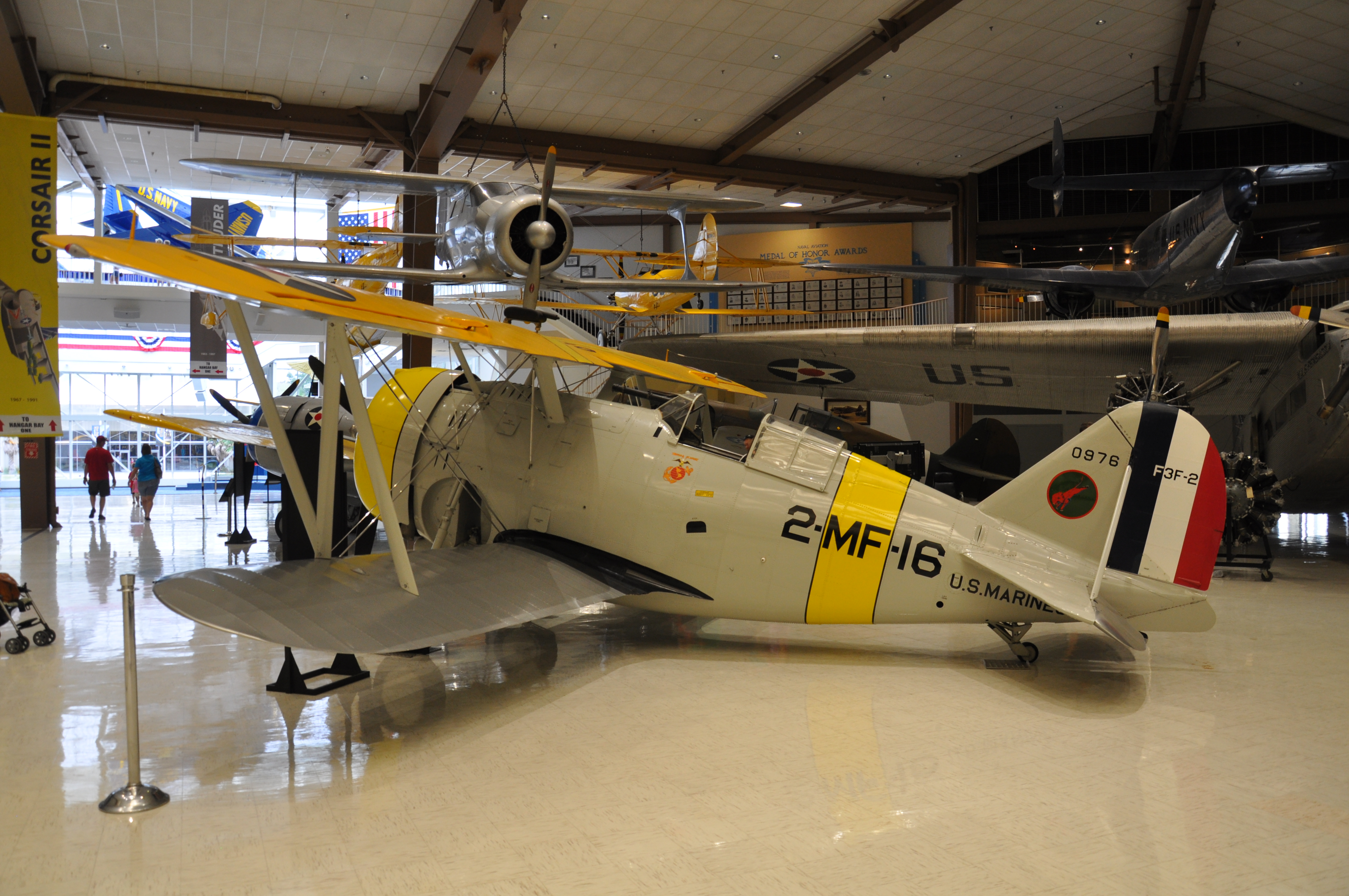
Grumman F3F-2, BuNo 0976, restored and displayed at the National Museum of Naval Aviation, NAS Pensacola, Florida, after 50 years in the Pacific Ocean off the California coast.

30 August
A Curtiss YP-37, 38–476, of the 22d Pursuit Squadron (Interceptor), 36th Pursuit Group, Langley Field, Virginia, piloted by Homer M. Truitt, is moderately damaged in a ground loop on landing at Langley Field.

2 September
Short Sunderland T9043 of the RAF's 210 Squadron (Coastal Command) leaves base RAF Oban at 10:30am but does not return. Neither the crew or a wreckage are ever found.

5 September
Flugkapitän Fritz Wendel, Messerschmitt's chief test pilot, performing series of diving trials on Messerschmitt Me 210 V2, Werknummer 0002, WL-ABEO, loses starboard tailplane in final dive, bails out, twin-engined fighter crashing in the Siebentíschwald, a section of municipal forest in Augsburg, Germany. This was the first of many losses of the type.

13 September
Fairey Battle, L5343 of No. 98 Squadron RAF (98 Sqn), the first RAF aircraft to deploy to Iceland on 27 August 1940, comes to an unexpected end on a test flight from Kaldadarnes, Iceland to Akureyri, Iceland when engine quits over remote area, wheels down emergency landing results in gear collapse, but pilot Fg. Off. "Willie" Wilcox and passenger Lt. Col. H. Davies of the Royal Engineers okay. Airframe is finally retrieved in 1972, restored, and is now displayed at the RAF Museum at Hendon, UK.

19 September
Roald Dahl's Gloster Gladiator Mk.I, K7911, low on fuel, crashes in the Libyan Desert (a.k.a. Western Desert) at sundown. "The landing gear hit a boulder and collapsed instantly into a pile of twisted metal and rubber, burying the nose of the plane into the ground. He was thrown violently forward against the front of the canopy. His nose was driven back into his face, his skull was fractured, and he was knocked unconscious." A No. 80 Squadron RAF (80 Sqn) report the following day states that "P/O Dahl posted to this squadron from T.U.R.P. for flying duties w.e.f. [with effect from] 20th September. This pilot was ferrying an aircraft from No. 102 Maintenance Unit (102 MU) to this unit, but unfortunately not being used to flying aircraft over the Desert he made a forced landing 2 miles west of Mersa Matruh. He made an unsuccessful forced landing but the aircraft burst into flames. The pilot was badly burned and he was conveyed to an Army Field Ambulance Station." Haunted by the experience, he pens a slightly fictionalized account, "Shot Down Over Libya", (Hawker Hurricane instead of a Gladiator; enemy fighter attack rather than low fuel), which is published in the 1 August 1942 issue of The Saturday Evening Post, credited only to "an RAF pilot at present in this country for medical reasons." This marks the beginning of his writing career.

20 September
Svenska Flygvapnet (Swedish Air Force) Seversky B6, 7203, '16', of Flotilla 6 (F6), written off during landing at Karlsborg at 10:25 by neophyte pilot who attempts a go-around without applying power and stalls. Pilot G. B. H. Lindstrom killed, flight cadet A. G. Nystrom in the rear seat is severely injured. Aircraft stricken 22 October 1940.

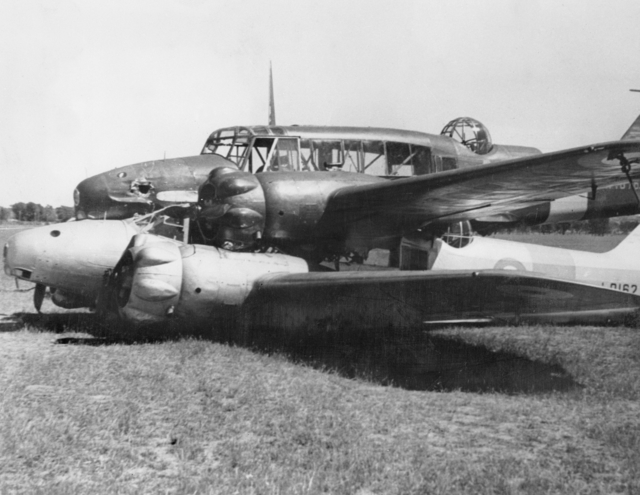
Two Avro Ansons after emergency landing in Brocklesby, New South Wales, 29 September 1940.

29 September
Avro Ansons, L9162 and N4876, of No. 2 Service Flying Training School RAAF (2 OTU RAAF) collide in mid-air becoming locked together. A successful emergency landing was made at Brocklesby, New South Wales. L9162 became a ground instructional airframe, while N4876 was repaired and returned to service.

30 September
Two Messerschmitt Bf 109Es of II./JG 2 collide on take-off from Octeville, France, killing both pilots.

Mid-October
A hangar fire aboard HMS Illustrious, which damages or destroys several Fairey Swordfish, forces postponement of an attack on the Regia Marina at Taranto, originally planned to take place on 21 October, Trafalgar Day, until the night of 11–12 November, now known as the Battle of Taranto.

18 October
First Bell YP-39 Airacobra, 40-027, crashes near Buffalo, New York, on eighth flight when only one main landing gear extends. Bell test pilot Bob Stanley bails out at 7,000 feet (2,100 m) rather than try a wheels-up landing, suffering only minor injuries when he lands in a tree. Examination of the wreckage shows that universal joints attached to the torque tubes driving the main gear struts had failed, as had limit switches placed in the retraction mechanism to shut off the electrical motors.

10 November
Three die in the crash of North American O-47A, 37–320, of the 1st Observation Squadron, based at Marshall Field, Fort Riley, Kansas, when it strikes a hillside 10 miles S of Centerville, Alabama, in a rainstorm and burns. Piloted by Lt. Richard R. Wilson, assigned at Fort Riley, the other victims are Lt. Benjamin F. Avery, of Aurora, New York, and Pvt. G. A. Catlin, assigned at Maxwell Field, Alabama. The flight left Candler Field at Atlanta at 1545 hrs. bound for Maxwell Field at Montgomery. "N. B. Poe, who lives two miles from the crash scene, pulled the three bodies from the burning wreckage and called air corps officials at Maxwell field [sic], Ala."

16 November
Dornier Do 26 V5 was lost on 16 November 1940, killing its crew, after being launched at night from the catapult ship Friesenland in Brest, France.

19 November
First Republic YP-43 Lancer, 39–704, caught fire in air over Farmingdale, Long Island, New York, pilot bailed out.

20 November
Prototype North American NA-73X Mustang, NX19998, c/n 73-3097, first flown 26 October 1940 by test pilot Vance Breese, crashes this date, on its fifth flight. According to P-51 designer Edgar Schmued, the NA-73 was lost because test pilot Paul Balfour refused, before a high-speed test run, to go through the takeoff and flight test procedure with Schmued while the aircraft was on the ground, claiming "one airplane was like another." After making two high speed passes over Mines Field, he forgot to put the fuel valve on "reserve" and during third pass ran out of fuel. Emergency landing in a freshly plowed field caused wheels to dig in, aircraft flipped over, airframe was not rebuilt, the second aircraft being used for subsequent testing.

21 November
Saro Lerwick, L7251, of 209 Sqn, is caught in a gale while moored on Loch Ryan, entrance hatches and front turret apparently not properly secured allow water to pour in, flying boat sinks.

6 December
Saro Lerwick, L7255, of 209 Sqn, moored at RAF Stranraer, is caught in a gale, one wingtip float breaks off, flying boat capsizes, sinks.

13 December
Two Northrop Nomad Mk. Is, of No. 3 Training Command RCAF, ex-USAAC Northrop A-17As, 93 of which were originally purchased by France but taken up by Great Britain after the Germans overran the continent in November 1940, with 32 transferred to Canada, collide in a blizzard whilst on a search and rescue mission for a third missing Nomad. One airframe, 3521, along with the remains of her crew, is discovered in Lake Muskoka, near Bracebridge, Ontario, by divers of the Ontario Provincial Police in July 2010. "A subsequent dive by the Royal Canadian Navy's Fleet Diving Unit (Atlantic) in October, 2012 saw the recovery of the two crewmen, RCAF pilot LAC Ted Bates and RAF pilot Flt.Lt. Pete Campbell, their personal effects, and three .303 machine guns." On 30 October 2014, recovery of the remarkably intact airframe, although in five major pieces, was begun by the National Air Force Museum of Canada, at Trenton, Ontario, where it is anticipated that the rare aircraft will undergo a full restoration. The aircrew received "a proper military funeral, which their families held in Guelph, Ontario," on 13 September 2013. The crew of the other Nomad involved in this accident, 3512, were Sergeant L. Francis and William J. P. Gosling. "Nomad 3512 and its pilot and co-pilot were located shortly after the crash." They were looking for Nomad 3503, flown solo by L.A.C. Clayton Peder Hopton, who is buried at Cabri, Saskatchewan. The wreckage of 3503 found in a swamp five miles SE of Camp Borden, Ontario, on 14 December.

16 December
The Grumman XF4F-3 Wildcat prototype, BuNo 0383, c/n 356, modified from XF4F-2, is lost at Norfolk, Virginia under circumstances that suggested that the pilot may have been confused by poor lay-out of fuel valves and flap controls and inadvertently turned the fuel valve to "off" immediately after takeoff rather than selecting flaps "up". This was the first fatality in the type.

18 December
Boeing Y1B-17 Flying Fortress, 36–157, c/n 1981, formerly of the 2d Bomb Group, Langley Field, Virginia, transferred to the 93d Bomb Squadron, 19th Bomb Group, March Field, California, in October 1940, crashed E of San Jacinto, California, 3.5 miles NNW of Idyllwild, while en route to March Field. Pilot was John H. Turner. "Six officers and men of the army's 93rd bombardment pursuit squadron [sic], March field [sic], were killed yesterday when their 22-ton B-17 four-motored bomber crashed and burned at the 6,700-foot snow line of Marion mountain in the San Jacinto range. Four bodies were hurled from the giant flying fortress as it plunged into the boulder-strewn, heavily wooded mountain slope, three miles northeast of Idyllwild, in the San Bernardino national forest. The victims: First Lieut. Harold J. Turner, pilot, Riverside, formerly of Corning, Iowa. First Lieut. Donald T. Ward, co-pilot, Riverside, formerly of West Los Angeles. First Lieut. Vernon McCauley, navigator, Riverside. Staff Sergt. Thomas F. Sweet, engineer, Riverside. Corp. Frank J. Jirak, assistant engineer, Salem, Ore. Pvt. James C. Sessions, radioman, Bisbee, Ariz. At 10:45 a.m. yesterday the plane appeared to encounter mechanical trouble. Ground witnesses at the Idyllwild inn and at Pine Cove, nearby, reported that it circled several times, its engines seemingly missing. Clouds closed in on the bomber at 8,000 feet, and in a few minutes, it roared earthward at full throttle. A rescue party arrived 20 minutes later from Pine Cove to find the plane a mass of red-hot, fused metal. Two bodies were in the smashed fuselage. The 105-foot [sic] wing had sheared through a big pine tree. Residents of the two resort towns said they had heard a loud explosion, indicating that the gasoline tanks ignited with the impact. The noise was heard as far as six miles. The crash occurred approximately 400 yards from the Banning-Idyllwild highway, near the home of Harris Marchant, writer. It was the first accident to one of the new Boeing four-motored bombers since the army air corps adopted them as standard equipment, although the original model smashed up at Dayton, Ohio, in 1935. Members of an army board of inquiry said at least two, and possibly three or all of the four motors were cut out at the time of the crash, although there was no apparent indication that any of the occupants had attempted to bail out. They expressed the theory that pilot Turner was attempting to shift gasoline tanks when he ran into a cloud bank that concealed the side of the mountain. Fliers in the squadron described the wrecked bomber as a ship which had caused difficulty in stalled motors twice in flights when it was stationed at Langley Field, Virginia. Lieutenant Turner was an army air corps reserve veteran of six years experience and was on a practice flight with the B-17. March field [sic] operates 36 of these bombers. With a full load, they can climb to 30,000 feet. Lieutenant Turner is survived by his widow, Kathryn, Riverside, and his father, J. H. Turner, Corning, Iowa. He was the nephew of former Iowa Gov. Dan W. Turner. Co-Pilot Ward leaves a widow in Riverside and a father, E. A. Ward, West Los Angeles. Navigator McCauley leaves his widow, Mrs. Virginia McCauley, Riverside. Sweet's widow, Mrs. Anna M. Sweet, lives in Riverside. Jirak's father, Frank J. Jirak, lives in Salem, Ore., and Session's mother lives in Bisbee, Ariz."

19 December
North American Harvard II, RCAF 2722, c/n 65-2455, on a delivery flight to Moose Jaw, Canada, flown by North American Aviation ferry pilot Clyde L. "Bud" Hussey, 30, goes missing near Kingston, California, on the Mojave Desert, out of a flight of four aircraft, between Palmdale, California, and Las Vegas, Nevada. After departing Palmdale at 0730 hrs., the flight encounters clouds and fog east of Baker, and after clearing Mountain Pass, the other pilots notice that Hussey is no longer in the formation. When he fails to arrive at Las Vegas, he is posted as missing. An extensive search for the yellow-painted aircraft turns up nothing until 16 January 1942, when cowboy Pat Frank, rounding up cattle for the Williams Ranch, discovers the wreckage in the Ivanpah Valley. Apparently, the pilot had followed the wrong road and flew into rising ground of "the cloud-obscured east flank of the rugged Ivanpah Mountains."

29 December 1940
Two Westland Whirlwind twin-engine fighters (P6975 & P6978) of 263 Squadron were in a section of three that took off from RAF Exeter and were transitting from Bovey Tracey towards Princetown, Devon to escort two incoming Catalinas from Darrel's Island, Bermuda, to Milford Haven but then re-tasked to patrol off Start Point. On encountering cloud the leader (F/L WOL Smith) and his No 2 (P/O DM Vine) descended through the cloud to check their position but were killed when they crashed into (believed) Foxtor Mires, a notoriously treacherous area of Dartmoor. The third pilot returned safely to base. Due to the uncertainty in establishing the exact location for the crashes both the pilot's bodies were not found for ten weeks by the MU tasked for the recovery, but the majority of the wreckage of both aircraft was left to settle into the boggy terrain.

31 December
A Vickers Wellington IA bomber, N2980, R for Robert, of No. 20 OTU, out of RAF Lossiemouth, suffers starboard engine failure at 8,000 feet in a snow storm while on a training flight over Great Glen, Scotland. Pilot, Squadron Leader Marlwood-Elton orders crew of six trainee navigators and the tail gunner to bail-out, all escaping safely save the gunner whose chute fails to open. Marlwood-Elton and P/O Slatter (also reported as Slater) then notice a body of water and they successfully ditch in the northern basin of Loch Ness near the A82 road, both escaping before the airframe sinks. Discovered by side-scan sonar in 1976, the rare Wellington is raised on 21 September 1985, and restored at Weybridge where she was built. Now on display at the Brooklands Museum, it is one of only two known intact Wellingtons.

== 1941 ==
1941
Sole Kellett XR-2, 37–378, modified from a Kellett YG-1C autogiro, is destroyed at Bolling Field in ground test by rotor-ground resonance problem – never flew. Funding transferred to Kellett XR-3.

5 January
Renowned aviator Amy Johnson takes off from an overnight stopover at RAF Squire's Gate near Blackpool in Airspeed Oxford V3540 on an Air Transport Auxiliary (ATA) delivery flight from RAF Prestwick, Scotland to RAF Kidlington, in Oxfordshire. In bad weather Johnson becomes lost and was next seen more than three hours later over the Thames Estuary. Johnson parachuted into the water, where the barrage balloon tender Hazlemere, spotting her descent, hurries to pick her up. By the time the vessel reaches Johnson she is exhausted and unable to grab the line thrown to her. An officer from the tender, Lt.Cmdr. Walter Fletcher, dives into the sea to help, but numbed by the cold Johnson sinks beneath the surface. Johnson's body is never recovered. Fletcher succumbs to the cold and also dies. Johnson had made headlines in 1930 when she had become the first woman to fly solo from England to Australia.

7 January
Saro Lerwick flying boat, L7262, of 209 Sqn is lost when pilot Flt. Lt. Spotswood is unable to take off near Stranraer, Scotland. After a long take off run, the hull strikes a floating obstacle and rapidly takes on water, sinks. Two crew are trapped and drown.

16 January
Douglas B-18A Bolo, 37-523, of the 73d Bombardment Squadron (Medium), 17th Bombardment Group (Medium), departs McChord Field, Washington, at 1020 hrs., on a training flight to the Muroc bombing range in the Mojave Desert of California, with seven on board. When it fails to make a scheduled stop at McClellan Field, Sacramento, California, concern was raised that it was down, somewhere north of the California state line. "The most definite report came tonight [17 January] from B. M. Oyster, employment and personnel manager of the Weyerhaeuser Timber Co., who came personally to McChord field to relate the story. Oyster said a timber crew foreman reported that a big plane appeared directly over the heads of a startled logging crew, in the Toutle river area, out of a cloud bank and barely skimmed the tops of 200-foot high trees." Before they could recover from their surprise or definitely identify the plane, it disappeared into another cloud bank. "Oyster informed officers that the Toutle river forks near the point, and continued flight up either bank would have meant disaster at the level at which the plane was last seen, flying southward. One fork leads towards Mount St. Helens, a 9,000 foot peak, and the other ends in a deep ravine." Hindered by bad weather and poor visibility, the air search is suspended after two weeks, until spring. Finally, on 3 February, two civilians notify the Army that they have discovered the wrecked bomber just below the summit of Deschutes Peak (elevation 4,322 feet), in the Snoqualmie National Forest, ~eight miles NW of Morton, Washington. "Harry Studhalter, 28, and Tom Harper, 39, woodsmen, said they sighted the wreckage on the 'little Rockies lookout' near Huckleberry mountain, in the foothills of Mount Rainier, through binoculars." The wreck site is reached and bodies recovered on 4 February. A flight chronometer indicates that the crash occurred at 1051 hrs. Killed are 1st Lt. Robert M. Krummes, 27, Boise, Idaho, pilot; 2d Lt. Charles Thomas Nielson, 22, Eau Claire, Wisconsin, co-pilot; 2d Lt. John E. Geis, 27, Seattle, Washington, navigator; Sgt. Paul L. Maas, 25, Quincy, Illinois, bombardier; Sgt. Leo H. Neitling, 28, Scio, Oregon, radio operator; T/Sgt. Hearn A. Davis, 30, Tacoma, Washington, flight engineer; and 1st Lt. Lewis E. Mackay, 27 Lincoln, Nebraska, passenger.

29 January
Brewster F2A-2 Buffalo, BuNo 1407, accepted 4 October 1940, to BatFor, San Diego, 14 October 1940; to VF-2, assigned to the USS Lexington, 15 October 1940, '2-F-2'; is lost prior to embarkation when a squadron pilot engaged in dive-bombing practice out of Pearl Harbor, H.I., loses both ailerons during 6G pull-out from what was claimed to be a 400 mph (643 km/h) 45-degree angle dive. With little control remaining, pilot successfully bails out. SOC 31 January 1941 with 132 hours on airframe.

Post-January
Prototype Tupolev ANT-58, also known as Samolet 103 (aircraft 103), first of what became the Tupolev Tu-2, crashes after uncontrollable fire in problematic starboard Mikulin AM-37 engine. Pilot Mikhail A. Nyutikov and observer A. Akopyan bail out, but Akopyan's parachute lines entangle in tail structure and he is killed.

4 February
Armstrong Whitworth Albemarle prototype, P1360, written off in crash landing on test flight out of RAF Boscombe Down when six-foot square panel is lost from port wing surface. John Hayhurst bails out successfully, but flight test engineer Norman Sharp's parachute entangles with tail structure and he releases his chute just before touchdown on a flat ridge on top of a quarry SE of Crewkerne, Somerset, landing at ~150 mph (240 km/h; 130 kn) in snow and bushes, surviving with serious injuries. Pilot Brian Huxtable survives crash landing.

5 February
Focke Achgelis Fa 223 V1 crashes when right rotor pylon breaks off in flight. Test pilot Carl Bode (25 February 1911 – 16 November 2002) successfully parachutes from the stricken helicopter (quite possibly the first helicopter parachute attempt ever), but passenger Dr. Ing. Heinz Baer is killed in the crash.

6 February
Boeing B-17B Flying Fortress, 38–216, c/n 2009, crashes near Lovelock, Nevada, while en route to Wright Field, Ohio, killing all eight on board. Pilot Capt. Richard S. Freeman had shared the 1939 MacKay Trophy for the Boeing B-15 flight from Langley Field, Virginia via Panama and Lima, Peru at the request of the American Red Cross, for delivering urgently needed vaccines and other medical supplies in areas of Chile devastated by an earthquake. General Order Number 10, dated 3 March 1943, announces that the advanced flying school being constructed near Seymour, Indiana, is to be named Freeman Field in honor of the Hoosier native. Ref The World War II Heritage of Ladd Field, CEMML, Colorado State University- Chapter 4.0 Cold Weather Test – p. 22; "One of the B-17s was lost in a February crash that took the lives of the eight men on board. They had been en route to Wright Field via Sacramento, carrying records and reports of the station. The loss of this crew weighed heavily on the small contingent at Ladd who were weathering the first winter of operations. Roads on Ladd Field were later named for the some of these crew members: Freeman, Ketcham, Whidden, Trainer, Gilreath, Davies, and Applegate." Lost aboard 38–216 was Captain Richard S. Freeman of Indiana, 1Lt. Edward W. Ketcham (Home of Record Unknown), Sergeant Everett R. Crabb of Harrisburg, Illinois, Sergeant Joseph Pierce Davies, Jr. of Ohio, Technical Sergeant E.H. Gilreath of Virginia, Sergeant Elmer S. Trainer of California, and Sergeant Frank C. Whidden of Florida.

8 February
Prototype Curtiss XSB2C Helldiver, BuNo 1758, suffers engine failure just prior to landing at Buffalo, New York, and fuselage is heavily damaged. Repaired.

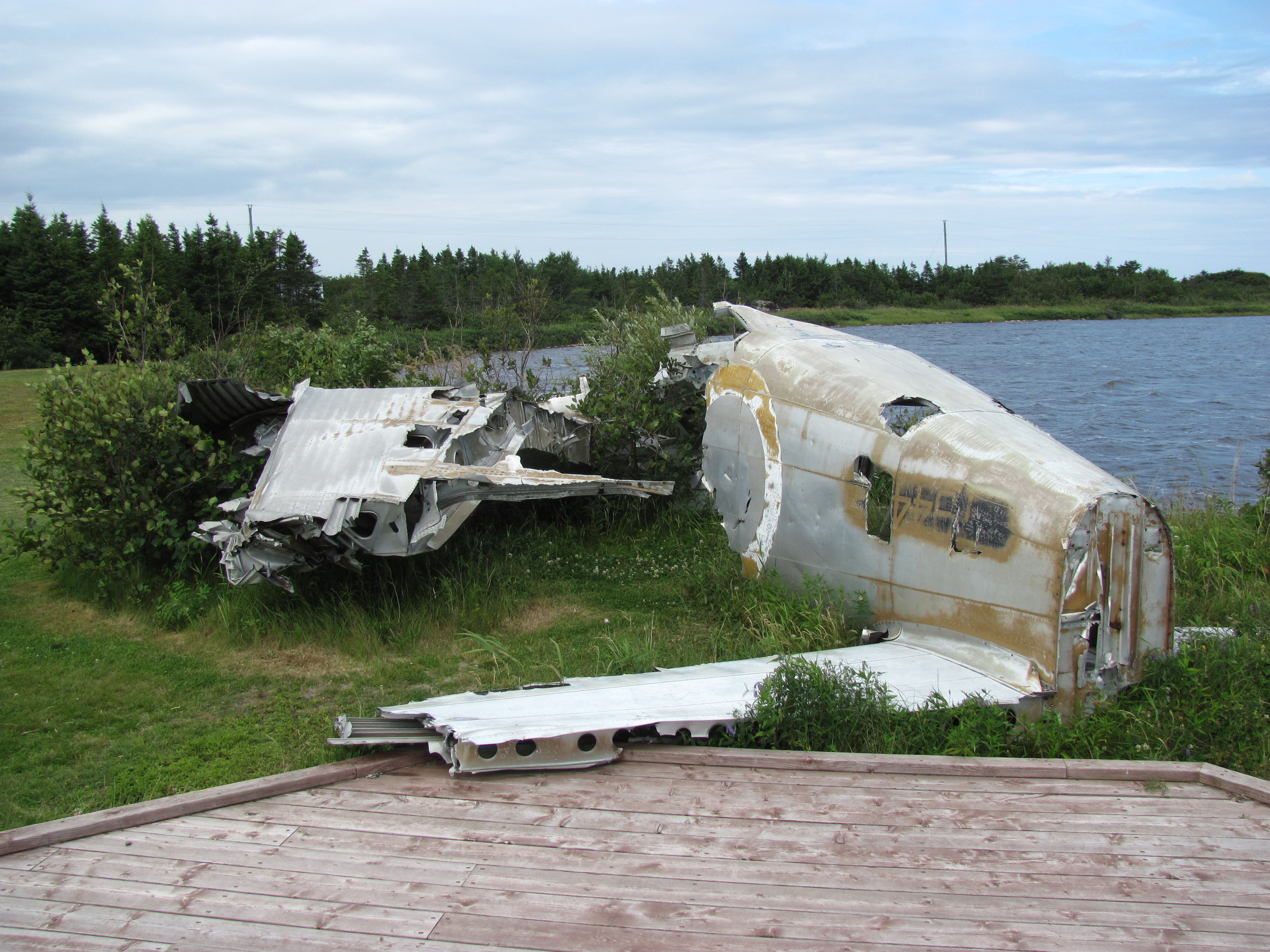
Wreckage of Hudson III, T9449, in Banting Memorial Park.

20 February
RAF Lockheed Hudson III, T9449, one of five on a delivery flight to England, departs Gander, Newfoundland, at 1958 hrs., but over the Atlantic Ocean, ~50 miles from Gander, the oil supply to the starboard engine fails. Pilot, Captain Joseph Mackey, attempts to shut down the engine and feather the propeller but finds that it will not feather. While attempting a return to the departure airport the port engine suffers the same failure. Aircraft crashes into trees on the side of Seven Mile Pond, ~16 km (10 miles) from Musgrave Harbour, killing navigator William Bird and radio operator William Snailham. Passenger Sir Frederick Banting, Nobel Laureate, and one of the two co-discoverers of insulin, suffers fatal injuries, dying the next day. Wreckage sighted from the air on 25 February and Capt. Mackey rescued by a party from Musgrave Harbour. In 1990, the wreckage is airlifted to Musgrave Harbour and placed in Banting Memorial Park, and in 1991 the Banting Interpretation Centre is built, with another Hudson displayed near T9449's remnants.

22 February
Saro Lerwick flying boat, L7263, of 209 Sqn, piloted by Plt. Off. Fyfe, goes missing. Extensive air and sea searches turn up no trace, nor any of 14 on board, including Wing Commander Bainbridge. A new C.O., Wing Commander MacDermott, is appointed a few days later.

25 February
Douglas B-18 Bolo, 36–446, c/n 1747, formerly of the 11th Bombardment Group Heavy (H), crashes due to main bearing failure on port engine. The crew was rescued three days later. Since then, the aircraft has been sitting in a gulch on Laupahoehoe Nui LLC property, Hamakua, Hawaii. Pacific Aviation Museum hopes to recover and restore the aircraft.

28 February
"SAN DIEGO, Calif., Feb. 28, (AP) – Failing to free himself from the training plane he was piloting when it went into a spin, James Spillman, 23, army air corps cadet flyer stationed at Lindbergh field, died in a crash today six miles north of San Diego. William E. Clark, civilian instructor, leaped to safety in a parachute after ordering Spillman to leave the plane. Clark said that he stayed in the ship until he saw that it could not be brought out of the spin." Ryan PT-20A Recruit, 40-2409, c/n 347, operated by the Ryan School, San Diego, crashed at Kearny Mesa, San Diego.

4 March
Douglas TBD-1 Devastator, BuNo 0377, assigned to USS Lexington, but operating out of NAS North Island, San Diego, California, on a bombing training flight, suffers engine failure after making a practice drop, and ditches in the Pacific Ocean, sinking in ~100 fathoms ~5 miles W of Mission Beach, California. Pilot 1st Lt. (j.g.) W. A. H. Howland, AOM2c R. Rogers, and AMM3c O. A. Carter successfully deploy dinghy and are rescued after ~30 minutes by light seaplane tender USS Williamson. Rediscovered in 1996, the location was kept secret as the TBD is considered one of the holy grails of lost Naval Aviation. In February 2011, the National Museum of Naval Aviation at NAS Pensacola, Florida, announced plans to recover and restore the rara avis. Those plans are later canceled when it is decided that the plane is too deteriorated to recover.

6 March
"Langley Field, Va. March 6 (AP) – An Army bomber on a training flight crashed in to the shallow waters adjacent to Langley Field today, killing the pilot, 2d Lieut. Barnard P. Smith Jr., 20, of Bartow, Florida. Boats reached the wreckage of the Martin B-10 ship and the body was extricated within a few minutes, but Smith was apparently killed by the impact of his plane with the water." B-10M, 34–91, c/n 622, of the 3d Observation Squadron, stalled and spun in into the Back River.

6 March
"Honolulu, Hawaii, March 6 (AP) – First Lieut. Brewster Ward, 25 years old, of Buffalo, N.Y., was killed today as his pursuit ship crashed and burned near Haleiwa field, in northern Oahu Island. Ward was based at Wheeler field here. The widow, Barbara, and a son, Brewster Jr., live here." Ward was flying Curtiss P-36A Hawk, 38–75, when he crashed.

9 March
At around 7.30 am a Messerschmitt Bf 110 was attempting to shoot a bus that was en route to Rabat from Nadur on the island of Gozo. In doing so the pilot found himself in a difficult position to maneuver his aircraft away from the oncoming cliff and the plane disintegrated on impact killing both crewmembers on board. Despite this none of the bus passengers were reported injured. This was the first plane crash on the island of Gozo.

21 March
RAF Vickers Virginia Mk.X K2329 of the Parachute section, 13 Maintenance Unit crashes on take-off from RAF Henlow, Bedfordshire.

24 March
Final Saro Lerwick flying boat loss for 209 Sqn, before transition to Consolidated Catalina, occurs this date when L7252 strikes a powerful wave in bad sea conditions while landing at Pembroke Dock, throwing aircraft up, sinks rapidly, but all crew escapes. Other Lerwicks are transferred to No. 4 Operational Training Unit (4 OTU) for training purposes.

1 April
Lockheed Hudson NR-X flown by 220 squadron set off from R.A.F. St Eval, Cornwall in the early morning just after midnight. It was transporting one of the first radar for aircraft. It ran out of fuel during the night and crashed outside Maillé, France. Crew, including 755779 Sgt. R. E. Griffiths, survived the crash and found shelter with a family in the town but were later captured. Pilot name was Bob Milton. Co-pilot name was Sgt. Houghton.

16 April
Sole Martin XB-26D Marauder, 40-1380, assigned to the 18th Reconnaissance Squadron, 22d Bomb Group, Langley Field, Virginia, modified to test hot air de-icing equipment, is written off in a landing accident at Langley Field. Pilot was Dwight Divine II.

16 April
Lt. j.g. Yasushi Nikaido, fighter squadron leader of the Imperial Japanese Navy carrier Kaga, survives close call when Mitsubishi A6M, number 140, loses both port and starboard ailerons as well as part of the upper wing surface while performing dive of 550 km/h at 2,300 rpm, but pilot makes skilful emergency landing at Kisarazu Air Field. Accident is reported to Naval Aeronautical Headquarters, the Naval Aeronautical Technical Establishment, and the Yokosuka Air Corps.

17 April
During dive tests to determine why wrinkles are appearing on the surface plates of the wings, Lt. Manbei Shimokawa, squadron leader at Yokosuka Naval Air Corps, is killed in Mitsubishi A6M Model 21, number 135, equipped with balance tabs, when, during pull-out at 1,500 m (4,900 ft) from dive from 4,000 m (13,000 ft), parts are seen by ground observers to depart from the port wing, fighter drops nose, plunges into ten fathoms of water off Natsu Island. The popular pilot is found in the wreckage with "his head entirely crushed into the instrument panel". Aeronautical Technical Establishment investigation reveals that flutter and vibration tests had not simulated the stiffness distribution of actual airframes and that the ailerons and horizontal stabilizers had been torn out. Fighter had previously been assigned to the carrier Akagi. Shimokawa is posthumously promoted to Lieutenant Commander.

5 May
Major George Putnam Moody (13 March 1908 – 5 May 1941), an early Air Force pioneer, is killed while flight-testing the first of what will be the Beechcraft AT-10-BH Wichita advanced two-engine training aircraft, Beechcraft Model 25 prototype, at Wichita Army Airfield, Kansas, when it stalls/spins shortly just after takeoff on its first flight. The aircraft burns. According to the cutline of an Associated Press wirephoto on p. 1 of The Lowell Sun, Lowell, Massachusetts, "The plane side-slipped on the takeoff, plunged to the ground from a height of 100 feet and caught fire." The pilot had arrived at Wichita on Tuesday 29 April from Maxwell Field, Alabama, for the test programme. There appears to be no official accident report for this crash. Major Moody earned his military wings in 1930 and flew U.S. airmail as a member of the United States Army Air Corps in 1934. Valdosta Airfield, Valdosta, Georgia, opened 15 September 1941, is renamed Moody Army Airfield on 6 December 1941 in honor of Maj. Moody. The AT-10 is used extensively at Moody AAF during World War II.

7 May
The second prototype MiG I-200, fitted with a prototype of the temperamental Mikulin AM-37 engine and first flown on 6 January 1941, experiences severe vibration problems and, despite efforts to cure the problems, it fails during a flight this date, and the airframe is destroyed in the ensuing crash.

10 May
At 2305 hrs. Messerschmitt Bf 110D, Werknr 3868, 'VJ+OQ', appears over Eaglesham, Renfrewshire. Pilot bails out and when challenged by David McLean, Head Ploughman of a local farm, as to whether he is German, the man replies in good English; "Yes, I am Hauptmann Alfred Horn. I have an important message for the Duke of Hamilton". Horn is taken to McLean's cottage where McLean's wife makes a pot of tea, but the German requests only a glass of water. Horn has hurt his back and help is summoned. Local Home Guard soldiers arrive and Horn is taken to their headquarters at the Drill Hall, Busby, East Renfrewshire, near Glasgow. Upon questioning by a visiting Royal Observer Corps officer, Major Graham Donald, Horn repeats his request to see the Duke. Donald recognises "Hauptmann Horn" to be none other than Rudolf Hess. The remains of Hess' Messerschmitt Bf 110 are now in the Imperial War Museum.

14 May
Grumman XP-50 Skyrocket, 40-3057, crashes into Long Island Sound during first test flight when the starboard turbo-supercharger explodes. Pilot Robert Hall bails out. Built as a company project, it was allocated a USAAF serial, but was destroyed before being taken on charge.

17 May
A storm line with "cyclonic winds and torrential rains" over Ohio forces down two Air Corps planes within fifteen minutes at widely dispersed locations, killing seven crew. Beechcraft AT-7, 41-1147, c/n 439, of the 55th Support Squadron, Barksdale Field, Louisiana, piloted by Robert Sonenfield, on a routine navigation flight to Cleveland, strikes a hill eight miles N of Nelsonville, near Carbon Hill, killing all five aboard. A quarter hour later, North American AT-6 Texan, 40-2159, c/n 59-1985, from Bolling Field, Washington, D.C., crashes 100 miles W near Wilmington, killing two. (Also cited as crashing at Martinsville). Dead in the AT-7 are Second Lts. William J. Wiandt, of Akron, James Criswell, of Pittsburgh, Robert L. Brown, of Salt Lake City and Denver, Sonenfield, of Lakewood, Ohio, and Sgt. John H. Davis, of Shreveport, Louisiana. Davis' body is found at noon 17 May amidst the widely spread wreckage. Killed in the AT-6 are Capts. Ralph A. Van Derau (or Von Derau), of Dayton, and John C. Stanley, of Ashland, Kentucky.

17 May
A Grumman F4F Wildcat, '6-F-2', of VF-6, aborts landing aboard USS Saratoga off the San Diego coast when Ens. H. E. Tennes, Chicago, cannot extend the undercarriage. He ditches in San Diego Bay. Flotation bags deploy to keep the fighter from sinking and it and the pilot are rescued by a Navy crash barge.

29 May
HMS Sheffield, operating in the North Atlantic following action with the German battleship Bismarck, catapults two Supermarine Walrus off at 1334, one for an anti-submarine patrol, the other to drop a message aboard flagship HMS Renown, then proceed to Gibraltar to fetch mail, and was, for this reason, carrying as passenger Regulating Petty Officer J. W. B. Marjoram, in addition to crew Lieutenant (P) B. A. H. Brooks, Lieutenant (A) A. Nedwill, and Leading Aircraftman J. A. Saville. Upon reaching Renown four minutes later, pilot Brooks flew over the forecastle, "and then, for reasons only to be guessed at, decided to make a low pass over the stern. In doing so he steered through the hot gases rising from Renown's funnels. The Walrus was flung over by the hot up-blast, out of control, and fell, to strike the stern awning tripod and then crash into the sea. Only RPO Marjoram was picked up by the destroyer Wishart, unfortunately to die of his injuries. His body was taken onto Gibraltar, reached by Force H at 1900." Wrote Sheffield's Captain Charles Larcom, "A young lieutenant, not fourteen days on board, took my aircraft to drop messages on Renown, and cutting a dash, as I guessed he would, killed himself, another young officer and two men. It is too much at once." Sheffield had lost three crew and five seriously injured while duelling with Bismarck.

Early summer
Junkers Ju 288 V4, D-AACS, crashed during one of its first test flights from Dessau, Germany. Fire starts in the port BMW 801MA radial engine nacelle during landing approach at Dessau, burning so fiercely that it cuts through the main longerons, virtually severing the forward fuselage from the center fuselage. Despite severe damage, airframe is rebuilt and resumes flight test programme in late November.

2 June
First British Consolidated LB-30 Liberator II, AL503, on its acceptance flight for delivery from the Consolidated Aircraft Company plant at San Diego, California, crashes into San Diego Bay when flight controls freeze, killing all five civilian crew, CAC Chief Test Pilot William Wheatley, co-pilot Alan Austen, flight engineer Bruce Kilpatrick Craig, and two chief mechanics, Lewis McCannon and William Reiser. Craig, who had been commissioned a 2nd Lieutenant in the U.S. Army Reserve in 1935 following Infantry ROTC training at the Georgia Institute of Technology where he earned a Bachelor of Science degree in aeronautical engineering, had applied for a commission in the Army Air Corps before his death. This was granted posthumously, with the rank of 2nd Lieutenant, and on 25 August 1941, the airfield in his hometown of Selma, Alabama, was renamed Craig Field, later Craig Air Force Base. Investigation into the cause of the accident causes a two-month delay in deliveries, so the RAF does not begin receiving Liberator IIs until August 1941.

8 June
Fourth prototype Heinkel He 177A Greif V4, wrk.nr. 0000004, fails to pull out of a moderate dive during dive trials, crashes into the Baltic Sea, off Ribnitz-Damgarten. It was later discovered that the accident had resulted from the malfunctioning of a controllable-pitch propeller control mechanism.

16 June
USAAF Douglas O-38F, 33–324, c/n 1177, first aircraft to land at Ladd Field, Alaska, in October 1940, this aircraft flew various missions until it crashed on 16 June 1941, at 1450 hrs., due to engine failure about 70 miles (110 km) SE of Fairbanks. Uninjured, the pilot, Lt. Milton H. Ashkins, and his mechanic, Sgt. Raymond A. Roberts, hiked to safety after supplies were dropped to them. The abandoned aircraft remained in the Alaskan wilderness until the National Museum of the United States Air Force arranged for its recovery by a CH-47 Chinook helicopter from Fort Greely on 10 June 1968. Despite being exposed to the Alaskan weather for 27 years, the aircraft remained in remarkable condition. Only the wings required extensive restoration.

21 June
Lieutenant Colonel Elmer D. Perrin, a native Texan, and the district supervisor, Eastern Air Corps Procurement District, since 1939, and Air Corps representative to the Glenn L. Martin Company, Baltimore, Maryland, is killed in a crash during an acceptance test of, Martin B-26 Marauder bomber, 40-1386, near the aircraft plant north of Baltimore, coming down ~1/2 mile after take off in woods and burning. Copilot A. J. Bowman of the Martin Company was also killed. Lt.Col. Perrin was the Air Corps' most experienced B-26 pilot at the time of this accident. In January 1942, Grayson Basic Flying School, Grayson County, Texas, is renamed Perrin Field in his honor, later Perrin Air Force Base.

22 June
Royal Air Force Boeing Fortress I, AN522, c/n 2054, of 90 Squadron, RAF Great Massingham, flown by F/O J. C. Hawley, breaks up in mid-air over Yorkshire during a training flight. Single survivor, a medical officer from RAE Farnborough, reports that the bomber entered a cumulo-nimbus cloud at 33,000 feet (10,100 m), became heavily iced-up with hailstones entering through open gunports, after which control was lost, the port wing detached, and the fuselage broke in two at 25,000 feet (7,600 m). Survivor, who was in the aft fuselage, was able to bail out at 12,000 feet (3,700 m).

29 June
Curtiss XSO2C-1 Seagull, BuNo 0950, crashed at NAS Anacostia, Washington, D.C.. To mechanics school at NAS Jacksonville, Florida.

2 July
A Wellington of RAF 311 Squadron (Czechoslovakia) based at RAF East Wretham was returning from a bombing mission at Brest attacking the “Prinz Eugen” in the company of other Wellingtons from RAF Honington. As the Wellington R1516 KX-U re-entered British territory it alerted defence stations because its radio and IFF installation had failed and it was assumed to be an enemy aircraft. A Bristol Beaufighter (T4638) was dispatched from RAF Middle Wallop and the Wellington was shot down near Mere in Wiltshire, UK. All the crew died. They were pilot Sgt. Oldřich Helma; second pilot Sgt. Antonín Plocek, navigator P/O Richard Hapala, wireless operator Sgt. Adolf Dolejš and air-gunners Sgt Jaroslav Petrucha and Sgt Jaroslav Lančík) Sgt. Petrucha's remains were returned to Czechoslovakia. The others are buried here in Devizes Road Cemetery, Salisbury, UK.
3 July
Royal Air Force Boeing Fortress I, AN528, c/n 2065, of No. 90 Squadron RAF (90 Sqn) at RAF Polebrook, is destroyed when a troublesome engine catches fire during a late-night ground run.

3 July
Luftwaffe Experten Major Wilhelm Balthasar, (47 credited kills), Geschaderkommodore of Jagdgeschwader 2, and winner of the Knight's Cross of the Iron Cross with Oak Leaves, is killed in action on this date when his Messerschmitt Bf 109F-4 suffers failure of a wing and he crashes into Ferme Goset, Wittes, France, near Saint-Omer. The airframe is recovered in March 2004.

9 July – 10 July
In a span of under three hours, three Junkers Ju 88As suffer controlled flight into terrain in northeast England, believed to be due to a British radio counter-measure 'Meacon' which falsifies German navigational beacon signals and caused the planes to fly headlong into coastal hills. The first Ju 88A comes in from the sea in mist and flies into the ground at Speeton near Bridlington at 2348 hrs. All crew KWF. At 0006 hrs., another Junkers flies into a cliff at Cliff Farm, Staithes, Yorkshire, in bad weather, killing all crew. A third bomber comes in from the sea in mist and flies into the ground at a shallow angle at Speeton near Bridlington at 0120 hrs. The aircraft is burnt by the crew who are all captured.

15 July
A Heinkel He 111 bomber, DA+AZ, of Luftwaffe flight school FFS (C) 12, goes out of control while returning to Prague Ruzyně Airport, Prague (Hlavní město Praha), Czechoslovakia, and crashes into a house at 975 Novotny Street in the village of Jeneč. Airframe destroyed. Two pilots, a student and instructor Marahrens Hans Otto Herbst, killed, but sole occupant of the house, railwayman Mr. Rufr, Spice, survives. Luftwaffe pays for identical rebuild of the destroyed home.

23 July
While deployed to Alpena, Michigan, for a gunnery exercise, Lt. James R. Taylor of the 71st Pursuit Squadron, flying Lockheed YP-38 Lightning, 39-695, of the 27th Pursuit Squadron, 1st Pursuit Group, suffers a port engine fire on takeoff from Selfridge Field which causes his fighter to strike pine trees. The pilot dies of his injuries a few days later. 71st FS history incorrectly lists accident date as 11 May 1941.

7 August
Bruno Mussolini, the son of Italian dictator Benito Mussolini and commander of the 274a Squadriglia (274th Squadron), was piloting one of the prototypes of the "secret" Piaggio P.108B bomber, MM22003, near the San Giusto Airport in Pisa. He flew too low and crashed into a house. The cockpit section separated from the rest of the aircraft and although the aircraft did not catch fire, it was nevertheless totally destroyed in the impact. Five members of the crew were injured and three died, including Bruno. Benito Mussolini rushed to the Santa Chiara Hospital to be at the side of his dead son.

21 August
Twenty-four-year-old Lt. Eugene M. Bradley, of Antlers, Oklahoma, assigned to the 64th Pursuit Squadron (Interceptor), 57th Pursuit Group (Interceptor), is killed while engaged in a dogfight training drill with Frank Mears, commander of the 64th. Lt. Bradley's Curtiss P-40C, 41-13348, spins out of a tight turn and spirals into a grove of trees 1 mile W of Windsor Locks Army Air Base, Windsor Locks, Connecticut, the first fatality at the new base. Following his funeral in Hartford, Lt. Bradley's remains are interred at San Antonio National Cemetery in Texas. In January 1942, the War Department formally authorized the field's designation as Bradley Field, as a tribute to the flier's memory, so designated on 20 January. It is now Bradley International Airport.

27 August
Four Boulton Paul Defiants of No. 256 Squadron RAF on practise formation flight, on NE heading a little W of Blackpool at 2,000 feet (610 m), break formation – right into a trio of Blackburn Bothas of No.3 School of General Reconnaissance, flying NW at 1,500 feet (460 m). First two Defiants avoid Bothas, but third off the break, N1745, 'J-TP', strikes one Botha, L6509, cutting it in two, and losing one of its own wings. Botha comes down on ticket office of Blackpool Central railway station, starting a large petrol-fed fire. The Defiant impacts on a private home at No. 97 Reads Avenue. Thirteen killed outright, including all four aircrew, 39 others injured. Of 17 detained in hospital, five later died. All civilian casualties were visitors to the seaside resort, except for one occupant of the house on Reads Avenue. This accident caused more casualties than all the enemy air raids on Blackpool and The Fylde during the entire war. https://web.archive.org/web/20080418232602/http://web.ukonline.co.uk/lait/site/Botha-Defiant.htm

4 September;
RAF Vickers Virginia Mk.X J7434 of the Parachute section, 13 Maintenance Unit undershoots on landing at RAF Henlow, Bedfordshire and is declared Cat M.

3 October
Heinkel He 177A Greif V1, wrk. nr. 0000001, CB+RP, is destroyed on landing, when both main gear struts are sheared at the mounting points.

14 October
First accident involving Saro Lerwick flying boat assigned to No. 4 Operational Training Unit occurs when L7268 dives into the sea near Tarbat Ness following failure of the port engine. Type could not maintain altitude on single powerplant. Six crew killed, three recovered alive.

20 October
A Messerschmitt Bf 109F–2, Werk Nr. 12764, previously flown by Rolf Pingel (1 October 1913 – 4 April 2000), a German Luftwaffe experten (ace) and recipient of the Knight's Cross of the Iron Cross, captured on 10 July 1941 when Pingel was forced to crash land in England near St Margaret's at Cliffe after being hit by fire from a British Short Stirling bomber that he was pursuing, returned to flying condition by the RAF and allocated the serial ES906, crashes this date near Fowlmere, killing Polish pilot F/O J. Skalski.

21 October
First prototype Saro Lerwick, L7248, on strength with the Marine Aircraft Experimental Establishment, crashes into hill at Faslane, probably as a result of engine failure, seven crew killed.

25 October
Luftwaffe experten Hauptmann Franz von Werra (21 kills) takes off from Katwijk, Netherlands, in Bf 109F-4 W. Nr. 7285 of I./JG 53 on a practice flight. His aircraft suffers a complete engine failure and crashes into the North Sea N of Vlissingen. Werra is presumed killed, though his body is never found. Werra is generally regarded as the only Axis prisoner of war to succeed in escaping from Canadian custody and returning to Germany. Werra's story was the subject of the 1957 film The One That Got Away starring Hardy Krüger as Franz von Werra. The film was based on a book by Kendall Burt and James Leasor published in 1956.

2 November
Wisconsin-native Lieutenant Thomas "Bud" L. Truax is killed, along with his wingman, Lt. Russell E. Speckman, in a Curtiss P-40 Warhawk training accident during poor weather in San Anselmo, California. In the late afternoon, San Anselmo residents are startled when two low-flying Curtiss P-40C Warhawks, 41-13375 and 41-13454, roar up the valley at just above roof level and crash into the east side of Bald Hill just shy of the peak at 1740 hrs. It was almost dark, was misty and they were under a low cloud ceiling. They were critically low on fuel and part of a larger training group that had gotten separated. They were under the wintertime marine layer of low clouds that are common in the Marin County area, searching for nearby Hamilton Field to land. Madison Army Air Field, Wisconsin, is named Truax Field in his honor in 1942. A third pilot, Lt. Walter V. "Ramblin" Radovich, flying 41-13392, had left the formation over San Rafael, almost hit the city courthouse on 4th Street, circled the Forbes Hill radio beacon (37°58'44.73"N,122°32'50.78"W), clipped a tree and then turned northeast, towards Hamilton Field. Unsure of what the oncoming terrain might be and critically low on fuel, he decides to climb up though the typically thin marine cloud layer to 2500 ft, trim the airplane for straight and level flight and bail out. According to USAAF accident reports, his left leg was broken when exiting the plane and he parachuted down, landing near Highway 101 in Lucas Valley reportedly near where Fireman's Fund / Marin Commons is currently located (38° 1'10.66"N, 122°32'29.36"W). Ironically, after Lt. Radovich bailed out, the airplane slowly descended back down through the clouds and made a relatively smooth "gear up" landing. All aircraft were of the 57th Pursuit Group (Interceptor), on a cross-country flight from Windsor Locks Army Air Field, Windsor Locks, Connecticut, to McChord Field, Washington.

4 November
Tail section of Lockheed YP-38 Lightning, 39–689, separates in flight over Glendale, California, Lockheed Lightning crashes inverted on house at 1147 Elm Street, killing Lockheed test pilot Ralph Virden. Home owner survives, indeed, sleeps right through the crash.

10 November
Tiger Moth with two-man crew crashes in the yard of Big Hill Springs School north of Cochrane, Alberta. Flying Officer James Robinson, piloting the plane, is killed instantly. 19-year-old L.A.C. Karl Gravell, student wireless-air gunner, although severely injured, attempts to pull Robinson from the burning aircraft; he dies four hours later at Colonel Belcher Hospital in Calgary. Gravell is posthumously awarded the George Cross for his rescue attempt. Frances Walsh, the teacher at Big Hill Springs School, receives the George Medal for her heroic actions in assisting Gravell.

11 November
Saro Lerwick flying boat, L7257, of No. 4 OTU, sinks at mooring, Invergordon, when caught in a gale.

17 November
Northrop A-17, 35-112, from Albuquerque Army Air Base, NM crashed in Bear Canyon, Sandia Mountains. Killed were Geldon T Miller, 2nd Lt, and Howard L Edwards S/Sgt, 38th Reconnaissance Squadron.

17 November
Gregory Boyington, checking out in Curtiss P-40 Tomahawk, P-8102, of the American Volunteer Group, at Kyedaw, Burma, overrevs the engine while recovering from a potential ground-loop upon landing, doing unsuspected internal damage to the Allison V-1710 engine. When pilot Jim Cross takes it up later in the morning, the engine throws a rod and begins burning, and he force lands in a clearing. The P-40 is written off and used for spare parts.

19 November
North American P-64, 41-19086, assigned to the 66th Air Base Squadron, Luke Field, Arizona, one of six NA-68s ordered by the Royal Thai Air Force which were seized before export by the US government in 1941, after the Franco-Thai War and growing ties between Thailand and the Empire of Japan, crashes and burns 20 miles NW of Luke Field after a stall/spin, killing pilot Charles C. Ball. These aircraft, designated P-64s, were used by the USAAC as unarmed fighter trainers.

22 November
Luftwaffe experten Werner Mölders, traveling as a passenger in a Heinkel He 111, bearing Geschwaderkennung code '1G+TH', of Kampfgeschwader 27 "Boelcke" from the Crimea to Germany to attend the funeral of his superior, Ernst Udet, who had committed suicide, is killed during an attempted landing at Breslau during a thunderstorm when the aircraft crashed at 1130 hrs. Near Breslau, the port engine failed and the crew tried to land at the nearest available airfield, Schmiedefelde. At low altitude, the second engine cut and the He 111 hit the ground near Martin Quander Farm at N°132 Flughafenstrasse. Mölders, pilot Oberleutnant Kolbe and flight engineer Oberfeldwebel Hobbie were killed. Major Dr. Wenzel and radio operator Oberfeldwebel Tenz survived the crash landing. Dr. Wenzel sustained a broken arm and leg as well as a concussion, and Tenz a broken ankle. Mölders' fatal injuries included a broken back and a crushed ribcage. Accident investigators then and since have speculated whether Mölders would have survived the crash if he had used his seat belt. In his memory, on 20 December 1941, JG 51 was bestowed the honor name "Mölders".

26 November
Mitsubishi A6M2, c/n 3372, coded 'V-172', of the 22nd Air Flotilla Fighter Unit, forced-lands on a beach at Leichou Pantao, China, as lost flight of two runs low on fuel. Discovered mostly intact, dismantled and shipped to United States for testing, this was the first of the type to fall into Allied hands. Later test-flown at Eglin Field, Florida, then put on tour as war bond exhibit. Disposition unknown following end of hostilities.

28 November
First prototype Grumman XTBF-1 Avenger, BuNo 2539, suffers fire in bomb bay during test flight out of Long Island, New York, factory airfield, forcing pilot Hobart Cook and engineer Gordon Israel to bail out. (Joe Mizrahi source cites date of accident as 28 August 1941.)

30 November
The Japanese submarine I-10, patrolling in the South Sea region in advance of the attack on Pearl Harbor, launches a Yokosuka E14Y floatplane on a night air sortie of Suva Bay in the Fiji Islands. It reports sighting no enemy in the harbor but then fails to return to the sub. The I-10 searches for three days but fails to find the scout.

11 December
American John Gillespie Magee, Jr., serving with newly formed No. 412 Squadron RCAF at RAF Digby on 30 June 1941, is killed at the age of 19, while flying Supermarine Spitfire AD291 'VZ-H', in a mid-air collision with an Airspeed Oxford trainer from RAF Cranwell, flown by Leading Aircraftman Ernest Aubrey. The aircraft collided in cloud cover at about 400 feet (120 m) AGL, at 1130 hrs. over the village of Roxholm which lies between RAF Cranwell and RAF Digby, in Lincolnshire. Magee was descending at the time. At the inquiry afterwards a farmer testified that he saw the Spitfire pilot struggling to push back the canopy. The pilot stood up to jump from the plane but was too close to the ground for his parachute to open, and died on impact. Magee is buried at Holy Cross, Scopwick Cemetery in Lincolnshire, England. On his grave are inscribed the first and last lines from his poem High Flight.

12 December
Major General Herbert A. Dargue, the first recipient of the Distinguished Flying Cross (United States), en route to Hawaii to assume command of the Hawaiian Department from Lieutenant General Walter Short, is killed when his Douglas B-18 Bolo, 36–306, of the 31st Air Base Group, crashes in the Sierra Mountains, S of Bishop, California, in worsening weather conditions. One account states the wreckage not found until March 1942. (Joe Baugher cites discovery date of 5 July 1942.) Besides the general, seven are KWF, his staff, including Colonel Charles W. Bundy, Chief of the War Plans Division, and crew chiefs, critically needed in the Pacific. Actual discovery date is 7 May 1942, when George B. Burns, a civilian from Spokane, succeeds in locating the downed ship on Kidd Mountain which his son, Lt. Homer C. Burns, was co-piloting. Lt, Burns was commanding officer of the 18th Transport Squadron, March Field, California. Wirephoto shows aircraft was still wearing the red-centered star roundel. The body of Pvt. Samuel J. Van Hamme, radio operator, of Twin Falls, Idaho, is recovered on 10 May and taken to Big Pine, California, and onto March Field the next day. That is the only body immediately recovered, search efforts hampered by snow pack, and the evidence that the bomber struck initially a quarter mile from where the wreckage comes to rest. Lt. Burns' body, recovered in June, is cremated in California, with memorial services in Spokane on 18 June. A Liberty ship converted as an aircraft repair ship will be named Major General Herbert A Dargue.

18 December
A RAF Lockheed Hudson III, V9032, of No. 6 Operational Training Unit RAF (6 OTU), crashes onto the farmhouse of Quarry Farm at Ingleby Barwick near Thornaby, England, while on a training mission when aircraft stalls soon after takeoff. Plane and house destroyed in inferno. Of the occupants, a farmer, his wife and two of his children are killed, two other children, boys aged nine and eleven escape. The twenty-three-year-old pilot and five other crew members are KWF. The pilot's fiancée offers to adopt the surviving children. Killed are F/Sgt Albert G. Graves RAF, pilot, 23, of Ashford, Kent; Sgt Richard H. D. Palmer RAFVR, pilot, 27; P/O Michael B. Van Heerdan RAFVR, observer, 23, of Pretoria, Transvaal, South Africa; Sgt Leslie Hogg RAFVR, WOp/AG, 27, of West Croydon, Surrey; Sgt Harry W. G. Hewitt RAFVR, WOp/AG, 21, of Teddington; Mr. James R. Garbutt, 39; Mrs. Violet M. Garbutt, 41; Master Alick R. Garbutt, 8; and Master Charles R. Garbutt, 6, all of Quarry Farm, Ingleby Barwick.

21 December
Curtiss XSB2C-1 Helldiver, BuNo 1758, destroyed after suffering a structural failure in the starboard wing and tail collapse while pulling out of a dive from 22,000 ft. Pilot Baron T. Hulse bails out. Airframe had previously crashed on 8 February 1941 due to engine failure during approach. Sustained damage to fuselage but was repaired.

21 December
No. 4 Operational Training Unit RAF (4 OTU) loses third Saro Lerwick flying boat, L7265, when Flg. Off. Armstrong hits water hard near Invergordon while practising landings, wing distortion leads to total loss of control, all crew escape.

30 December
Nine Martin B-26 Marauder bombers of the 33d Bombardment Squadron, 22d Bombardment Group, depart Muroc Army Air Field for March Field, California, but only eight arrive. In bad weather, B-26, 40–1475, snags a pine tree and crashes on Keller Peak in the San Bernardino Mountains, killing nine. Wreckage not found until 14 January 1942. Late the next day, a recovery team of sheriff officers and members of the 33rd Squadron reaches the site after a four-mile trek with toboggans from Snow Valley. All of the crew had been thrown from the plane except for one, whose body was trapped beneath the fuselage. A plaque was installed on a rock near the crash site in August 1995 commemorating the lost crew. Two of the other Marauders in this flight were deployed onto Midway Island and saw action in the Battle of Midway on 4 June 1942 in a torpedo attack on the IJN Akagi. One was shot down.

== 1942 ==
January
Lt. Ivan Chisov of the Red Air Force survives miraculous fall from 22,000 feet (6,700 m) without opening his parachute after departing a heavily damaged Ilyushin Il-4 twin-engined medium bomber when he passes out at high altitude. Afraid of being attacked by German fighters, he delayed opening his chute but passed out from the lack of oxygen at high altitude. After achieving a terminal velocity of about 150 mph (240 km/h), he is decelerated when he hits the lip of a snow-covered ravine, sliding down with decreasing speed until he stops at the bottom, suffering a broken pelvis and severe spinal injuries.

6 January
Beechcraft F-2 Expeditor, 40-686, c/n 344, based at Felts Field, Spokane, Washington, departs Gray Army Airfield, Fort Lewis, Washington, on a morning flight with three aboard and vanishes. The flight contacted Medford, Oregon, at 1049 hrs., and at 1053 hrs. announced a change in the flight plan. Nothing more was heard. "A ground searching party and four aerial searching parties combed the country as far south as Redding, Calif., but the heavy snowfall apparently concealed all traces of the plane at the time." The wreck is discovered 15 miles SE of Ashland, Oregon, near the California-Oregon border, on 9 June 1942, and reported by George E. Miller, Oregon state fire patrolman stationed at Ashland. He makes his way to Yreka, California, to report the find and said the plane had apparently struck a peak in the Siskiyou Mountains head-on. Geiger Field officials identify the victims as: First Lieutenant Raymond Ansel Stockwell, 39, whose wife resides at Garden Springs Terrace in Spokane; Technical Sergeant Paul W. Stone, son of Calvin H. Stone, Bayview, Texas; and Technical Sergeant Randolph Jones, son of Joseph E. Jones, 2405 Connor Street, Joplin, Missouri. "Lieutenant Stockwell was identified as a well-known Northwest and Alaska flyer, who had enlisted in the army as a private, taken flight training and received his commission in September 1941." Wreck is surveyed on 29 September 1942.

13 January
Heinkel test pilot Helmut Schenk becomes the first person to escape from a stricken aircraft with an ejection seat after the control surfaces of the first prototype Heinkel He 280 V1, DL+AS, ice up and become inoperable. The fighter, being used in tests of the Argus As 014 impulse jets for Fieseler Fi 103 missile development, had its regular Heinkel-Hirth HeS 8A turbojets removed, and was towed aloft from Rechlin, Germany by a pair of Messerschmitt Bf 110C tugs in a heavy snow-shower. At 7,875 feet (2,400 m), Schenk found he had no control, jettisoned his towline, and ejected. A 12 June 2003 press release by the Martin-Baker Company gives the details of this incident as "The first recorded live emergency ejection took place from a Heinkel 280 on the 13th January 1943. The pilot Herr Schenke, was on a ferry flight." Note the date discrepancy and the different spelling of the pilot's name. The release also states that "It is estimated that some 60 emergency ejections were made in WW2 by Luftwaffe pilots. It is not known how many were successful."

14 January
A Douglas B-18A Bolo bomber, 37–619, of the 1st Reconnaissance Squadron, returning from submarine patrol duties went off course due to high winds, darkness and poor radio contact. Instead of landing at Westover Field, later Westover AFB, in Massachusetts they crashed into Mount Waternomee in New Hampshire's White Mountains. 5 of the 7 crew members survived.

16 January
A Douglas TBD-1 Devastator, BuNo 0335, '6-T-14', of Torpedo Squadron 6 (VT-6), from USS Enterprise, piloted by Chief Harold F. Dixon, becomes lost while on patrol, and ditches in the South Pacific when fuel is exhausted. A search the next day fails to spot them. Dixon and his two crew, bombardier Anthony J. Pastula and gunner Gene Aldrich, survive for 34 days in a small rubber raft with no stored food or water, before drifting ashore on the Pukapuka atoll. Dixon is awarded the Navy Cross for "extraordinary heroism, exceptional determination, resourcefulness, skilled seamanship, excellent judgment and highest quality of leadership."

29 January
A North American Harvard I, N7179, of 61 OTU, crashes on takeoff at Heston, Middlesex, England, killing Royal Air Force pilot Victor William Gunther, service number 113404, age 31.

8 February
Reich Minister for Armaments and Ammunition Fritz Todt is killed when the Heinkel He 111 he is aboard explodes and crashes shortly after departing the Rangsdorf Wolfsschanze (Wolf's Lair) airfield near Rastenburg in East Prussia. It has been suggested that he was the victim of an assassination conspiracy but nothing was ever proven.

10 February
A Hawker Hurricane Mk.I, P3664, of No. 55 OTU, based at RAF Usworth, crashes in bad weather in an orchard opposite the High Marley Hill Radio Mast, killing RCAF Sergeant Pilot James D’Arcy Lees Graham, 24, of Carstairs, Alberta. The Air Ministry Crash Card records that the fighter flew into high ground in a squall, the weather deteriorated and the aircraft dived out of low cloud into a snow squall and failed to pull out of the dive. The pilot was interred at St Margaret's Church Cemetery, Castletown, Sunderland.

25 February
"Lieutenant Clark of the army air corps, flying an army pursuit plane, made a forced landing on the farm of Stephen Shirley in the Oakway community about 12:30 last Thursday afternoon, February 25," reported The Keowee Courier, Walhalla, South Carolina, on 5 March 1942. "The plane was slightly damaged and the pilot suffered no injury except being jarred lightly as the plane 'pan-caked' onto the cotton field. The cause of the forced landing was not disclosed and the mission of the flight was not given as other than practice maneuvers. Friday morning army wrecker service from the air base at Savannah was on the site to dismantle the plane for shipment back to the base for repairs. The Oconee home guard stood guard duty on the spot of the crash from an hour or so after the mishap until the plane was removed Friday." About 30 different men of Company G of the Oconee Home Guard stood guard duty during the approximate 24-hour vigil. The Aviation Archeological Investigation & Research database lists Curtiss P-40C, 41-13382, of the 65th Pursuit Squadron, 57th Pursuit Group, out of Trumbull Field, Groton, Connecticut, flown by Thomas W. Clark, as suffering a forced landing near Seneca, South Carolina, in Oconee County, suffering moderate damage on 26 February 1942, which, in this case, was the date of the airframe's recovery. Repaired, this airframe would go to reclamation at Patterson Army Airfield, Ohio, on 12 May 1945. Captain Clark would later score four aerial kills with the 57th Fighter Group in the Mediterranean Theatre, two on 26 October 1942, and one each on 13 January and 26 February 1943. In a related story, a man whose automobile was halted by the Oconee guard on Thursday night, fled on foot through a nearby cotton field after being told to halt. The vehicle was found to have 90 gallons of illegal liquor concealed in its trunk, which was packed in 15 cases containing six gallons each in half-gallon fruit jars. The county officers were notified immediately. "The booze was confiscated by the officers and a search for the missing driver was begun." The man's hat was found about 100 yards from the road on a terrace of the field.

18 March
The first German A-4 flight-test model, ("Launch Aggregate 1"), completed 25 February 1942, but which slips out of its "corset" after being fully tanked at Test Stand VII at Peenemünde due to contraction of the fuselage from the cold propellants, falling 2 meters, smashing three fins, and coming to rest on the rim of the engine nozzle; repaired and renamed Versuchsmuster 1 (V1: Experimental Type 1), at 2345 hrs., this date, the rocket fails during a test firing with flame bursting through the side just above the engine, wrecking the steam generator and many lines on board, with the engine shutting off automatically. Leaks in the fuel and oxidizer lines caused by vibration and stress are determined to have let an explosive mixture to have built up over the head of the motor and the rocket is junked for parts without any launch attempt. Albert Speer witnesses this test failure.

23 March
North American B-25B Mitchell, 40-2291, piloted by 1st Lt. James P. Bates, crashes on take-off from Auxiliary Field No. 3, Eglin Field, Florida, during training for the planned Doolittle Raid on Japan. This aircraft did not participate in the mission. Bates deployed with the Raiders aboard the USS Hornet (CV-8) but did not fly the mission.

25 March
Test pilot Fritz Wendel takes Messerschmitt Me 262 V1, PC+UA, on its first jet-powered flight but experimental BMW 003 gas turbine engines both fail and he has to limp the prototype airframe back to Augsburg on the nose-mounted Jumo 210 piston engine installed for initial airframe testing.

26 March
The first Bell XP-39E Airacobra (of three), 41-19501, with lengthened fuselage to accommodate the Allison V-1710-E9 engine, and used for determining handling qualities, armament tests, and maneuvers, crashes on its 36th test flight during a spin test out of Wright Field, Ohio.

26 March
The fifth Republic P-47B Thunderbolt, 41-5899, is lost when pilot George Burrell is forced to bail out after fabric-covered tail surfaces balloon and rupture. Pilot dies when his chute has insufficient time to open. Future P-47s have enlarged all-metal surfaces.

27 March
While Task Force 39 pushes through heavy North Atlantic seas near Sable Island en route to Scapa Flow, Rear Admiral John W. Wilcox, Jr., task force commander, goes overboard from USS Washington and is lost. USS Wasp launches four SB2U-2 Vindicator dive bombers to assist in the search, but one, BuNo 1362, of VS-71, piloted by Ens. Edwin S. Petway, crashes astern of Wasp while attempting to land, killing its two-man crew. The admiral's lifeless body is spotted briefly but not recovered.

3 April
The 303rd Bomb Group, activated at Pendleton Field, Oregon, on 3 February 1942, suffers its first fatal aircraft accident when three flying officers and five enlisted crew are killed in the crash of Boeing B-17E Flying Fortress, 41-9053, c/n 2525, six miles (10 km) N of Strevell, Idaho during a training mission.

6 April
Boeing B-17B Flying Fortress, 38-214, of the 12th Bomb Squadron, 39th Bomb Group, Davis-Monthan Field, Arizona, suffers engine failure with one bursting into flame, the bomber crashing into the desert 22 miles SE of Tucson, killing all five crew. "The dead and their addresses, as announced by Col. Lowell H. Smith, commander of Davis-Monthan air corps base, who said the tragedy was due to 'engine failure and fire in the air,' were: First Lieut. Donald W. Johnson, the pilot, of Dunning, Neb.; Sgt. Laurel D. Larsen, Minkcreek, Idaho; Pvt. Herbert W. Dunn, Mifflintown, Pa.; Pvt. Emerson L. Wallace, Philipsburg, Pa.; Pvt. Leo W. Thomas, Lemoore, California. Second Lieut. Sidney L. Fouts, of Santa Rosa, California, and Sgt. William F. Regan, of Dunmore, Pa., parachuted to safety, suffering only minor injuries and shock, the air base said."

6 April
"Honolulu, April 6 – Army authorities announced today that an army bomber crashed and burned last night with a loss of at least four lives. Four bodies had been recovered and it was feared there were additional victims." Boeing B-17E Flying Fortress, 41-2443, piloted by Ward Cox, Jr., out of Wheeler Field, crashes into cliffs of Mount Keahiakahoe near the Nu'uanu Pali in Hawaii while returning from antisubmarine patrol.

6 April
"San Diego, April 6 – Ensign Willard E. Norval, 26, Galesburg, Ill., and James F. Crow Jr., 18, apprentice seaman from White Deer, Texas, were killed today in the crash of their two-seater navy plane near Bonita, 10 miles southeast of San Diego."

8 April
An instructor and an aviation cadet are killed near Bakersfield, California, this date, when their Vultee BT-13, 41-9665, of the 327th School Squadron, Minter Field, crashes at Dunlap Auxiliary Field. KWF are Lt. William B. Raabe, and cadet Irel W. Crowe.

22 April
Consolidated B-24D-CO Liberator, 41-1133, c/n 73, piloted by Robert Redding, of the Combat Crew Training School, crashes into Trail Peak, near the Philmont Scout Ranch, 20 miles SW of Cimarron, New Mexico, while returning to Kirtland Field, Albuquerque, killing all nine people on board. Joe Baugher cites crash date as 22 May 1942.

23 April
US Navy Vought SB2U-2 Vindicator, BuNo 1363, of VS-71, assigned to the USS Wasp, but flown ashore to clear deckspace for Spitfires bound for Malta, crashes in peat bog near Invergordon, Scotland, killing Ens. Jackson and Aviation Machinist's Mate Atchison. Atchison's body recovered, but squadron diary records that Jackson's body and bulk of airframe were buried too deeply, so remains and wreckage were covered over.

23 April
"Seattle, May 12 (AP) – The 13th naval district staff headquarters today announced the names of next of kin of the four men killed and the three injured in an airplane accident in Alaska which was announced April [?] (text missing). Among the dead was Ensign Glenn R. Van Bramer, R. J. Van Bramer, father, R. F. D. No. 2, Billings, Mont." A Consolidated PBY-5A Catalina crashes while attempting a downwind take-off at Dutch Harbor, Alaska. "Plane appeared to get off three times, but each time settled back, struck sand spit, bounced up, and crashed on land and burned. Cause believed to have been a combination of diagonal downwind take-off and failure of lift due to ice on top of wings. Pilot:Ens.Frederick A. Smith/Killed, Ens.Glenn R. Van Bramer/Killed, Ens.John B. Carrol/Killed, Amm2c.Alvin F. Zettell/Seriously inj, Sea2c.Gifford A. King/Seriously inj, and Rm3c.Ralph Mitchell, Jr/Minor inj."

29 April
A Curtiss P-40 of the 49th Fighter Group, piloted by Lt. Bob Hazard, taking off as second of two P-40s from Twenty-Seven Mile Field, SE of Darwin, Australia, loses directional control in propwash of lead fighter, strikes recently arrived Lockheed C-40 parked next to airstrip, killing General Harold H. George, Time-Life reporter Melville Jacoby, and base personnel 2nd Lt. Robert D. Jasper, who were standing next to the Lockheed. A number of others receive injuries, but P-40 pilot survives. Victorville Air Force Base, California, is renamed for the late general in June 1950.

May (?)
Reggiane Re 2001, MM8071, (third one built), downed in the Tyrrhenian Sea apparently by engine failure, pilot recovered, possibly during ferry flight to Sardinian-based 2nd Gruppo. Airframe recovered 23 November 1991 by Sardinian chapter of the Gruppo Amici Velivoli Storici (GAVS), the Italian national aircraft preservation society for the Italian Air Force Museum. This is the only example of a Daimler-Benz inline engine equipped fighter to survive in Italy.

May
Grumman XF4F-6 Wildcat, BuNo 7031, prototype for the F4F-3A model, is written off in a crash.

3 May
Three Bristol Blenheim Mk. IVs, Z7513, Z7610, and T2252, of No. 15 Squadron SAAF, detached to support Allied ground forces garrisoning the oasis at Kufra in Libya, become lost while on a familiarisation flight and land in the Libyan Desert. They are not found until 11 May by which time only one of twelve crew survive. Z7610 and T2252 are flown out in May but damaged Z7513 is abandoned in place.

6 May
"Tacoma, May 7 (AP) – Rudolph Erlichman, [sic] widely known Seattle and Tacoma investment broker, was killed in an airplane accident in the royal Canadian air force, former business associates said here today. Details of the accident were not disclosed, but it was understood that Ehrlichman, former partner of the firm Drumheller, Ehrlichman & White, was one of eight flyers that lost their lives in an accident near, St. Johns, Newfoundland." Lockheed Hudson, RAF N7346, c/n B14L-1742, diverted to RCAF and serialled 761, of a detachment from No. 11 (BR) Squadron, departs RCAF Station Torbay, Newfoundland, at either ~1500 hrs., or 1742 hrs., on a ferry flight to Dartmouth, Nova Scotia, with four crew and four passengers aboard. On lift off one or both engines sputter and backfire and the aircraft sinks, but then the engines surge and the Hudson rises to 100 feet whereupon a left bank, characteristic of a side slip, develops and deepens, the plane sinks, drags the port wing tip, and cartwheels into a fiercely burning inverted pile of wreckage. The Board of Inquiry cites four causes:
(i) the aircraft was overloaded
(ii) the load was incorrectly distributed
(iii) partial failure of starboard engine
(iv) misuse of controls by pilot.
Crew victims were: Flt. Lieut. Joseph Hyacinthe Ulysses "Hughie" Leblanc, a pre-war RCAF pilot, Flt. Sgt William Freeborne Colville, Navigator, and two Wireless Air Gunners, Sgts. Harold Fulford Taylor and Monty Holt Brothers. Two passengers were Flt. Lieut. Rudolph Irwin Ehrlichman, and Cpl. Charles Frederick Else. Period records do not identify the third passenger, an airman from No. 1 Group, who hitched a last minute ride. This was the first, and, as it came to pass, the most serious fatal RCAF crash at Torbay.

7 May
"Montreal, Que., May 7 (AP) – The royal air force ferry command announced today that three men were killed in the crash of a Lockheed plane making a forced landing at Bradore Wharf, Que. The dead were listed as Leon Segal, Los Angeles, captain of the bomber, Pilot Officer James Watson, R. C. A. F., of Toronto, navigator, Martino M. Paggi, Los Angeles, radio operator."

20 May
"Montgomery, May 23 (AP) – Gunter field announced today that at least six British cadets were killed when their planes crashed in a storm Wednesday night, and that a seventh plane and its pilot were missing."

23 May
Lt. Virgil E. Holman, Rochester, Minnesota, dies in hospital on 24 May of burns sustained during the forced landing of Lockheed P-38F-1-LO Lightning, 41-7554, c/n 222-5681, from March Field, California, after engine failure, near Greenup, 16 miles W of Russell, Kentucky, this date.

23 May
North American B-25 Mitchell, 40-2173, c/n 62-2842, of the 390th Bomb Squadron, 42d Bomb Group, McChord Field, Washington, crashes, explodes and burns at the base during a routine flight, killing five crew. The Army Air Force said that this was the sixth bomber crash in the Pacific Northwest for the month of May, with a death toll of 30. Dead are Lt. Col. Eugene Wall, (listed as Eugene Nall in some records) Atmore, Alabama; 1st Lt. Charles E. Daly, Tacoma, Washington; M/Sgt. Delana A. Shephiard, 56, Frazier, Montana; Cpl. Guinn N. Murdock, 19, Denton, Texas; and PFC Walter F. Rudesill, 20, Hot Springs, Arkansas.

24 May
Lockheed C-40D, 42-22249, c/n 1273, ex-NC21770, Air Transport Command, Trans-Atlantic Sector, Bolling Field, Washington, D.C., crashes in swamp one mile NE of Howe Brook Mountain, NW of Houlton, Maine, during "routine" flight out of Houlton Army Air Base, after possible disorientation in poor visibility, killing all six aboard. Accident is first reported by forestry lookout station observer Alex Bouher. A detail of men under Maj. F. E. Lodge is dispatched to search the wooded area. KWF are 1st Lt. J. D. Fransiscus; Lt. Col. Louis S. Gimbel, New York City; 1st Lt. Herback; S/Sgt. Frederick Taylor; 2d Lt. Earl R. Wilkinson; and Lt. Col. Clarence A. Wright. SOC 1 June 1942. This airframe was one of eleven civilian Lockheed Model 12A Electra Juniors impressed 14 March 1942 by the United States Army Air Force (USAAF), with standard six-passenger interior. Surviving examples redesignated UC-40D in January 1943. The board of inquiry was unable to determine a cause, but listed weather and pilot inexperience under instrument conditions as factors. Lt. Col Gimbel, "who resided with his wife and two children at 163 East Seventy-eighth Street, New York City, was once an executive of the Saks Fifth Avenue and Gimbel stores. A graduate of Yale, he entered the Atlantic Ferry Service about six months ago and later transferred to the Army Air Corps. He was a son of the late Louis S. Gimbel and a cousin of Bernard F. Gimbel, President of Gimbel Brothers, Inc."

24 May
Two Curtiss P-40F Warhawks, 41-13793 and 41-13798, of the 62d Fighter Squadron, 56th Fighter Group (redesignated from the 62d Pursuit Squadron / 56th Pursuit Group on 15 May 1942), out of Newark Metropolitan Airport, collide at 12,000 feet on Sunday afternoon over Englewood, New Jersey, and plunge into the residential community of Teaneck, six miles west of the George Washington Bridge. Both pilots bail out and no one on the ground is badly hurt. "One plane sheared off the back of a garage and burst into flames; the other buried itself nose first in a dirt street in an exclusive area a mile away, in full view of wide-eyed residents." Lt. Meade M. Brown, Louisville, Kentucky, flying 13798, lands in a swamp, while Lt. Louis Bowen, (or Lewis Bowen) Champaign, Illinois, late of 13793, arrives on the front lawn of a home near Teaneck High School, suffering only cuts on the right leg. Falling wreckage damages a few homes.

30 May
Pilot Officer Albert Hoffman, RCAF, Ritzville, Washington, is killed in Lockheed Hudson Mk. V, AM737, of No. 31 OTU, while attempting a single-engine landing at RCAF Camp Debert, Nova Scotia sometime in the morning before 11:30 hrs. "He had to go around again to avoid an aircraft on the runway, the Hudson went out of control and crashed into some woods at the aerodrome boundary at Debert." The other members of the crew were: Sgt. William Divers Earl, Observer, and Sgt. Arthur Charles Norris, Wireless Air Gunner. Both were seriously injured with burns and fractures. Hudson AM737 to No. 4 Repair Depot for write off on 3 June 1942. Hoffman's body was accompanied to Ritzville by Captain T. C. Howland, flight commander, Camp Debert, and the 9 June funeral was overflown by a formation of Geiger Field aircraft.

30 May
McChord Army Air Base officers today announced the death of 2d Lt. Peter A. Trick, in a fighter crash on the Fort Lewis reservation. He was flying Lockheed P-38E Lightning, 41-2036, of the headquarters squadron, 55th Fighter Group, when he suffered engine failure on takeoff.

30 May
As Task Force 17 sorties from Pearl Harbor in preparation for the Battle of Midway, USS Yorktown flies aboard her patched-together air wing including VF-3 under Lieutenant Commander John S. "Jimmy" Thach. VF-3's executive officer, Lieutenant Commander Donald Lovelace, lands his Grumman F4F-4 Wildcat aboard Yorktown and taxis beyond the crash barrier. His inexperienced wingman, Ensign Robert Evans, comes in too high, misses the arresting wires, bounces once, floats over the crash barrier and his F4F-4 impacts on top of Lovelace's Wildcat, killing the XO. "After extricating Lovelace's body from the wreckage, both wrecked planes were unceremoniously shoved over the side, and landing operations continued." Lovelace, who had been scheduled for rotation back to the mainland and command of his own squadron, had opted to stay with VF-3 for this action specifically to pass along his experience to the body of untested new aviators of which Ensign Evans was one.

31 May
"Bogota, Colombia, June 1. (AP) – Three United States air corps flyers and a Colombia air force officer were killed when their reconnaissance plane crashed yesterday in a gorge about 10 miles south of here. The American dead are: Major John P. Steward and Staff Sergeants Carlyle Lewis and Thomas H. Noble. The Colombia officer was Major Felix Quinones, The flyers were making the last flight on a photographic mission for the Colombian government from their Orinoco river base. The cause of the crash was not determined and an investigation is being made."

1 June
Consolidated PBY-5 Catalina, BuNo 04439, of VP-43, returning to NAS Alameda after a night patrol, strikes mountains east of Half Moon Bay, California, between 2200 and 0000 hrs., killing seven of eight crew. Sole survivor, Ensign C. H. Apitz, 22, of Henderson, Minnesota, badly burned, cut, bruised, and in shock, walks eight to ten miles, reaching Half Moon Bay at 0400 hrs. Taken to Mills Memorial Hospital in San Mateo, Apitz could not say how he got clear but recalled watching the bomber burn. Amongst the dead was Seaman Kenneth Wayne Simmons, mother, Mrs. W. O. Simmons, Rt. 1, Pasco, Washington.

3 June
Williams Field, Arizona, suffers its first fatal accident in the six months it has been open as an advanced training base when Curtiss-Wright AT-9-CS Fledgling, 41-5867, of the 333d School Squadron, crashes five miles NE of the base, apparently flown into the ground, killing John Clifford Eustice, 23, of Salt Lake City, Utah, and Irving C. Frank, 24, of Brooklyn, New York.

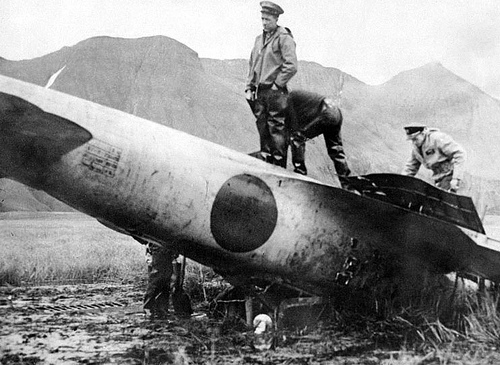
The Akutan Zero is inspected by US Navy personnel on Akutan Island on 11 July 1942.

3 June
The Akutan Zero – During a Japanese raid on Dutch Harbor, eastern Aleutians, Alaska, the Mitsubishi A6M Model 21, 4593, 'D1-108', flown by Flying Petty Officer 1st Class Tadayoshi Koga (10 September 1922 – 3 June 1942) takes hit to oil line in a brush with a U.S. Navy PBY Catalina. Pilot realizes he cannot make return flight to carrier Ryujo so he attempts emergency landing on what appears to be grassy terrain on Akutan Island but turns out to be soft muskeg, fighter overturning as landing gear makes contact, pilot killed by a broken neck. Attempt by Japanese submarine crew to rescue pilot is unsuccessful. U.S. Navy search team discovers nearly undamaged Zero with dead pilot still under the canopy, retrieves it and in August 1942 ships it to the Assembly and Repair Department at NAS North Island, San Diego, California for repair and evaluation, the second intact example to fall into American hands. Airframe had been built by Mitsubishi at Nagoya in February 1942. The Navy releases photos of the aircraft both under repair and in flight at San Diego on 15 October 1942.

4 June
"San Rafael, Calif., June 5, (AP) – Fourteen army flyers died in the crash of a heavy bomber near here last night, the army said today. Flames consumed the wreckage when the plane hit a hilltop as the pilot circled for an emergency landing. The plane developed trouble soon after a takeoff and radioed nearby Hamilton field to clear a runway. The pilot circled toward the field. The big ship lost altitude and then dived into a hillside on the Herzog ranch, three miles northwest of Hamilton field. As it crashed great flames swept through the wreckage. Not a man escaped." Consolidated LB-30 Liberator, AL601, was destroyed.

4 June
Pilot Dale Eugene Anderson escapes injury when he force lands Curtiss P-40-CU Warhawk, 39-289, of the 38th Fighter Squadron, 55th Fighter Group, out of Paine Field, Everett, Washington, ~three miles N of McChord Field, coming down about 40 feet off of the Pacific highway just S of Tacoma city center. "The plane passed over the tops of several automobiles on the busy highway. One driver, Charlie Mael, news stand operator at Fort Lewis, said the plane just missed his automobile, struck a ditch adjoining the highway and came to a stop a few feet from the road. Witnesses said the pilot walked away from the burning plane."

4 June
During the Battle of Midway, USS Yorktown, slowed to 16 knots by previous battle damage, launches Grumman F4F Wildcat fighters in early afternoon to meet a second Japanese attack force of ten Kate torpedo bombers and their Zero fighter escort. "A twenty-two-year-old ensign with the unlikely name of Milton Tootle IV had barely cleared the bow in his takeoff and did not even have time to manipulate the hand crank to wind up his landing gear when he wheeled toward an attacking torpedo plane and shot it down with one long burst. When he pulled up, he was struck by the Yorktown's own antiair fire and crashed into the sea. His whole flight lasted about sixty seconds, but he got his bogey." Tootle was flying F4F-4, BuNo 5239 of VF-3.

Post-4 June
Second prototype Fairey Firefly, Z1827, first flown 4 June 1942, of the Aeroplane & Armament Experimental Establishment (A&AEE), Boscombe Down, is lost shortly thereafter in a crash that kills chief test-pilot Flt. Lt. Chris Staniland. Investigation of wreckage reveals few clues, and loss is initially attributed to failure of the tailplane following failure of the fabric-covered elevators. Later, it is suspected that the cockpit hood detached in flight and lodged itself in the tailplane, disabling the elevators.

6 June
Several barrage balloons break free of their moorings in the Puget Sound area near Seattle, and soar over parts of northwest Washington and Vancouver, British Columbia, the dragging cables shorting out power lines, damaging houses, and knocking all but one radio station in Vancouver off the air. The army was working to trace those balloons not already found, and police in Vancouver captured one.

7 June
Major General Clarence Leonard Tinker, (21 November 1887 – 7 June 1942), of 1/8 Osage Indian heritage, leads an attack against Imperial Japanese Navy units during the Battle of Midway, but is shot down. His Consolidated LB-30 Liberator, AL589, of the 31st Bombardment Squadron, 5th Bombardment Group, 7th Air Force, is seen to go down, taking him, and eight other crew, to their deaths. Tinker was the first American general to die in World War II; his body was never recovered. He received the Soldier's Medal in 1931 and, posthumously, the Distinguished Service Medal. Tinker Air Force Base in Oklahoma City, Oklahoma, is named in his honor on 14 October 1942. Along with Major General Tinker (of Oklahoma), the following named Airmen were also lost: 2Lt. Walter E. Gurley of North Carolina, Major Coleman Hinton of Florida, 1Lt. Gilmer H. Holton, Jr., of North Carolina, Master Sergeant Franz Moeller of Alabama, Sergeant Thomas E. Ross of New York, Major Raymond Paul Salzarulo of Indiana, Staff Sergeant George D. Scheid of Utah, Sergeant Aaron D. Shank of Maryland, Technical Sergeant James H. Turk, Jr., of Texas, and Sergeant William J. Wagner of New York.

7 June
English Electric-built Handley Page Halifax BMk.II, serial V9977, crashed on a test flight from RAF Defford carrying a secret H2S radar system at 16:30 hrs at Welsh Bicknor, Herefordshire, killing the crew and several EMI personnel on board, including Alan Blumlein, pioneer of television and stereo audio recording. Blumlein, together with Cecil Browne and Frank Blythen, all from EMI, were attached to the Telecommunications Research Establishment (TRE) at the time of the accident. Also killed was Geoffrey Hensby of the TRE. While flying at 500 ft (150 m) a fire starts in the starboard outer engine. Unable to extinguish it and by then too low for a parachute escape, while attempting to reach an open area to put down the fire burns through the outer main spar at low altitude causing the outer wing to fold and detach, whereupon the aircraft rolls almost inverted and impacts the ground. The aircraft's highly secret cavity magnetron is recovered the next day by a TRE team from RAF Defford led by Bernard Lovell. An investigation into the cause of the fire by Rolls-Royce concludes that an insufficiently tightened inlet valve tappet locknut during maintenance caused the inlet valve to drop, where it was hit by the rising piston and broken off at the stem, allowing burning fuel to enter the rocker cover whereupon it quickly spread. V9977 was one of only two Halifaxes fitted with H2S, the other being the Handley Page-built Mk II, R9490, used for trials of a klystron-based version of the system, developed for security reasons due to the difficulty of self-destructing a magnetron should its carrying aircraft come down over enemy territory. The crash of V9977 wiped out almost the entire H2S development team, delaying its introduction to the extent that Churchill had to be informed.

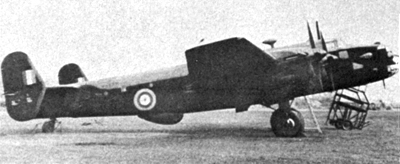
The Halifax II United Kingdom military aircraft serials V9977, which crashed killing Alan Blumlein and several other key British radar technicians 7 June 1942.

8 June
Goodyear prototype G-Class Blimp, G-1, purchased 23 September 1935, in constant use until it is lost in a mid-air collision on this date with L-Class Blimp L-2. The two blimps were conducting experimental visual and photographic observations during a night flight off of Manasquan, New Jersey. Although twelve people were killed in the crash (one survivor), the G-1 had demonstrated her capabilities as a trainer and utility blimp. As the Navy needed additional training airships during the World War II war time build up, a contract was awarded on 24 December 1942 for seven more G-class airships. These were assigned the designation "Goodyear ZNN-G". (Z = lighter-than-air; N = non-rigid; N = trainer; G = type/class). The envelope size of these new G-class blimps was increased over that of the G-1 by 13,700 cubic feet (390 m^{3}).

8 June
"Fort Benning, Ga., June 8. (AP) – Three army flyers were killed today when bombs from their own plane smashed the ship during bombing practice over the Fort Benning reservation. Lieutenant Russell J. Hammargren said an army bomber from Atlanta was demolished in the air when a bomb struck another that had just left the plane. He identified the dead as Captain Morris Pelham of Anniston, Ala.; Lieutenant Raymond Manley, Brooklyn, and Corporal Ray Roland, Columbia, Iowa. Hammargren said the bombing planes usually dropped practice bombs in a salvo but that the plane involved in today's accident apparently was dropping the missiles one by one." Douglas A-20A Havoc, 40-163, of the 56th Bombardment Squadron (Light), was actually flying from Hunter Army Airfield, Savannah, Georgia, when it was destroyed by the premature bomb explosion near Lawson Field.

13 June
The army announces on 14 June the death of Private Alexander Evan Campbell, 23, of Fairfax, Virginia, in the late day crash of Schweizer TG-2-SW, 42-8724, on Deadman Dry Lake, near Twentynine Palms, California. Campbell was born at Rigby, Idaho.

13 June
Lockheed P-38E Lightning, 41-2086, of the 37th Fighter Squadron, 55th Fighter Group, Paine Field, Washington, experiences engine failure on takeoff from Olympia Army Airfield, strikes St. Peter's Hospital, and burns in the street. Olympia firemen and hospital staff brave flames and exploding .50 caliber ammunition to pull pilot Ralph M. Edwards Jr. from the cockpit. Several firemen are treated for burns and Deputy Sheriff Ed Stearns is knocked to the pavement by an exploding shell fragment. Robert Hennesy, a military policeman, is also hospitalized after being thrown to the pavement when he contacts a power line broken by the falling plane. Stearns said that he had never seen such bravery as that of the firemen and Dr. Reed Ingham in saving the pilot, with "shells exploding all over the place." Edwards succumbed to his burns in hospital shortly after 1300 hrs.

13 June
Second Lieutenant Roy D. Stone Jr., Monrovia, California, is killed in Lockheed P-38E Lightning, 41-2078, of the 38th Fighter Squadron, 55th Fighter Group, Paine Field, Everett, Washington, when he force lands after engine failure at Lakeview, crashes and burns five miles SW of McChord Field, and 15 miles SW of Tacoma.

13 June
Consolidated PBY-5 Catalina, BuNo 04490, of VP-61, crashes on takeoff at Kodiak, Alaska, killing one crew. Underwing torpedo drops and runs but misses a ship and explodes between the docks.

15 June
"Macleod, Alta., June 15, (AP) – Two Canadian bombers [sic] collided in the air northeast of Granum today, killing an undetermined number of Canadian air force flyers. The planes were in a formation." Avro Anson Mk. Is, 6528, and AX166, of No. 7 Service Flying Training School, RCAF Station Fort Macleod, collide at 0900 hrs. while practice formation flying, four miles N of Granum relief field. LAC O. E. Olsen (or Olson?) killed in 6528, ex-RAF W2218, which is scrapped by No. 10 Repair Depot, struck off and reduced to spares and produce 12 March 1943. LAC Alexander John McLaren, 21, dies in AX166, scrapped by No. 10 Repair Depot, struck off on 27 November 1942.

15 June
Following engine failure, 2nd Lt. James H. Mitchell, 23, of Cleveland, intentionally banks away from a hangar occupied by some 200 men in the noon hour in his Lockheed P-38D Lightning, 40-783, of the 83d Fighter Squadron, dragging a wingtip at Mills Field, south of San Francisco, resulting in a fatal wrecking of his fighter but saving all those who he might have hit. Only a crew chief is killed besides the pilot when he deliberately crashed his plane.

16 June
Following return to Pearl Harbor, Hawaii, after the Battle of Midway, the USS Enterprise air group undergoes reassignments and training. On this date, flying Douglas SBD-3 Dauntless, BuNo 03283, "Ensign Carl Pieffer of Scouting Six was scheduled for a regular training flight, including a visit to Kaneohe across the island. The start of his take-off run across the mat at Ford Island looked normal but before he could gain flying speed he inexplicably lost directional control. The SBD swerved violently left, then right, and as the crash sirens began to howl, tore off its entire tail section on a parked crane, became briefly airborne, skimmed across the perimeter road barely clearing a loaded station bus and crashed flaming, to a stop a hundred feet away. Neither Carl nor his rear-seatman made any move to escape the burning wreck and the busload of startled sailors ran to pull them out." The gasoline-fed fire then ignited the 500-pound bomb carried by the dive bomber, killing both crew, five would-be rescuers, and injuring 17 more, some critically. Joe Baugher lists the Dauntless as assigned to VB-3.

18 June
Lt. jg. Ralph M. Rich is killed when, during a routine gunnery dive over NAS Kaneohe Bay, a wing tears off of Grumman F4F-4 Wildcat BuNo 5184, of VF-3, at 5,000 feet. Rich had shot down a Japanese torpedo plane at the Battle of Midway. He was awarded the Navy Cross posthumously for his "capable and aggressive leadership" in the Midway battle, which enabled his attack group to "maintain continuous flight over enemy naval units, thereby assuring our dive bombers an unmolested approach." Two U.S. Navy ships have been named for him.

19 June
Cadet Leon C. Harer, 21, Tacoma, Washington, departs Randolph Field, San Antonio, Texas, at 0020 hrs. in North American BT-9A, 36-120, c/n 19-77, of the 47th School Squadron, on a night navigation flight to Seguin, Luling, Lockhart, and San Marcos, and is missing when its fuel limits are reached. A pre-dawn search is launched, involving 18 aircraft along the cadet's projected course, and expanded at dawn to 150 miles in all directions. The cadet is the son of Lt. Col. L. G. Harer, Infantry. Wreckage is found two to four miles E of Seguin on 20 June.

28 June
Lockheed A-29-LO Hudson, 41-23260, c/n 414-6025, allocated to the RAF as BW398 but not taken up; reallocated to the Chinese Air Force on 30 March 1942; on this date departs Patterson Field, Ohio, for delivery to Orlando Army Air Field, Florida, but crashes in a hayfield at Lebanon, Ohio, ~25 miles S of Dayton, killing all four crew. Capt. John Van Cleve, of the Patterson Field public relations office, said the victims were from Lowry Field, Colorado, and had been here for temporary training. The dead were identified as: 2d Lt. William K. Van Zandt, pilot; 2d Lt. Ralph A. Oehmman Jr., copilot; T/Sgt. S. R. Elder, and S/Sgt. Corder.

30 June
The Sikorsky XPBS-1, BuNo 9995, hits a submerged log upon landing at NAS Alameda. Among its passengers was CINCPAC Admiral Chester W. Nimitz who suffered minor injuries. One member of the flight crew, Lieutenant Thomas M. Roscoe, died. The XPBS-1 sank and was lost.

1 July
Ex-American Airlines Douglas DST, DST-217, c/n 1976, NC18144, requisitioned by the USAAF on 8 June 1942 as C-49E, 42-56093, assigned to the 4th Troop Carrier Squadron, 62d Troop Carrier Group, crashes into a hillside Victory Garden this date at mountainous Premier, in southern West Virginia, killing all 21 aboard. This was the date that the 62d TCG was reassigned from Kellogg Field, Michigan, to Florence Army Airfield, South Carolina, and the C-49E was en route to the base. Pilot Walter R. Faught had attempted several landing approaches at Cincinnati Municipal Lunken Airport and on the last had slammed into the runway with enough force to damage wings and control surfaces. Rather than land and check the airframe, he elects to continue onto Florence, amidst turbulent weather. The transport was sighted about noon at low altitude over Coalwood, ~five miles from Premier, and witnesses reported that it shed a wing at 500 feet as it came down, which may have been the elevators. Wreckage burns for two hours, but recovery of victims begins even before fire is out. Bodies of 19 passengers and two crew recovered.

1 July
Consolidated LB-30 Liberator, AL527, of the 38th Bomb Squadron, 30th Bomb Group, flown by 1st Lt. Robert K. Murphy departs March Field, California, strikes the top of a low knoll two miles W of the field, and is destroyed in two explosions that initial reports describe as bombs going off. Officials said that this was a training flight, however, and that no bombs were loaded. Nine crew die.

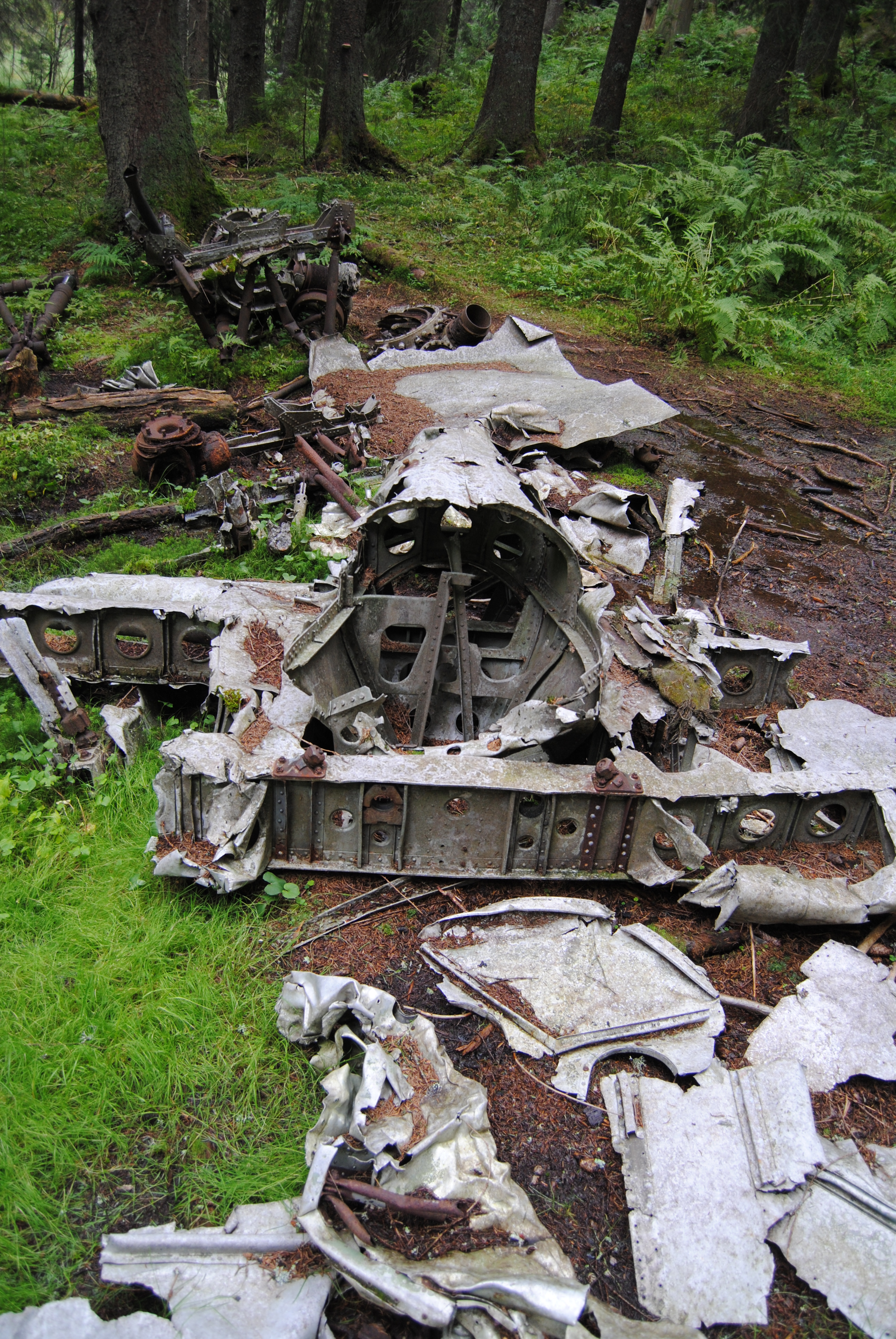
Wreckage of Do 17M-1, lost 2 July 1942, seen in 2013.

2 July
A Dornier Do 17M-1 crashes in Hansakollen in Maridalen, outside of Oslo, Norway. The Do 17 was heading to the airport at Gardermoen, but crashed into a mountainside, killing all three German aviators on board. They are buried at the German war cemetery at Alfaset. The wreck is well preserved and remains clearly visible, over 70 years after the accident.

15 July
During Operation Bolero, the ferrying of combat aircraft from the U.S. to the U.K. by air, a flight of two Boeing B-17E-BO Flying Fortress bombers, 41-9101, c/n 2573, "Big Stoop", and 41-9105, c/n 2577, "Do-Do", of the 97th Bomb Group and six Lockheed P-38F Lightnings of the 94th Fighter Squadron, 1st Fighter Group, on the 845-mile (1,360 km) leg between Bluie West 8 airfield and Reykjavík, Iceland, run out of fuel after being held up by bad weather, and all force-land on the Greenland icecap. All safely belly in except for the first P-38 which attempts a wheels-down landing, flipping over as nosewheel catches a crevasse, but pilot Lt. Brad McManus unhurt. All crews rescued on 19 July, but aircraft are abandoned in place. One P-38F-1-LO, 41-7630, c/n 222-5757, now known as "Glacier Girl", recovered in 1992 from under 200 feet (61 m) of accumulated snow and ice and rebuilt to flying status, registered N17630. One Boeing B-17 ("Big Stoop") also found, but it is too badly crushed for recovery. Although the USAAF had expected to lose 10 percent of the 920 planes that made the North Atlantic transit during Bolero, losses were only 5.2 percent, the majority being involved in this single incident.

30 July
The Focke-Wulf Fw 190 V13, Werke Nummer 0036, unarmed prototype for the Fw 190C-1, with a 1,750 hp (1,300 kW) Daimler-Benz DB 603A engine, crashes shortly after beginning testing.

8 August
The sole Republic XP-47B Thunderbolt, 40-3051, operating out of the Republic plant at Farmingdale, New York, is lost when the pilot interrupted wheel retraction, leaving the tailwheel in the superchargers' exhaust gases. This set the tire alight which ignited the magnesium hub. When the burning unit retracted into the fuselage, it severed the tail unit control rods, forcing the pilot, Fillmore "Fil" Gilmer, a former naval aviator, to bail out with the airframe crashing in the waters of Long Island Sound. Loss of prototype went unpublicized at this early stage of the war. Nothing is ever found of the wreckage.

8 August
1st Lt. Edward Joseph Peterson dies in hospital from injuries suffered in the crash this date of Lockheed F-4 Lightning, 41–2202, a reconnaissance variant of the P-38, when it suffers engine failure on take-off from Air Support Command Base, near Colorado Springs, Colorado. Field is renamed Peterson Army Air Field on 3 March 1943, later Peterson Air Force Base on 1 March 1976.

14 August
When Lt. Elza Shahn ferried his Lockheed P-38F Lightning to Britain, he spotted a German Focke-Wulf Fw 200C-3 Condor near Iceland. These German long-range reconnaissance aircraft gathered data on weather and allied shipping to help U-boats attack ships in the Atlantic. Lt. Shahn shot the Condor down, becoming the first American Army pilot to shoot down a German plane in World War II.

16 August
U.S. Navy L class blimp L-8, a former Goodyear advertising blimp, of ZP-32, departed Treasure Island, San Francisco, California, with crew of two officer-pilots. Five hours later the partially deflated L-8 is sighted drifting over Daly City, California, where it touches down sans crew. Nothing is ever found of Lt. Ernest D. Cody and Ensign Charles E. Adams. It is assumed that they were lost over water but were never found. The control car from this blimp is now in the National Museum of Naval Aviation, NAS Pensacola, Florida.http://www.check-six.com/Crash_Sites/L-8_crash_site.htm

17 August
Grumman XF6F-3 Hellcat, BuNo 02982, first flown 30 July 1942, suffers engine failure of Pratt & Whitney R-2800-10 on test flight out of Bethpage, New York, Grumman test pilot Bob Hall dead-sticks into a farmer's field on Long Island, survives unpowered landing but airframe heavily damaged.

17 August
Messerschmitt Me 262 V3 fails to achieve flying speed on his first take-off in the type from Leipheim air field, overruns runway, crashing in an adjacent potato field, in the first Me 262. Both engines of the aircraft are torn from the nacelles, both wings damaged and starboard wheel shorn off, but the airframe is deemed repairable. The pilot was uninjured.

20 August
Flight Lieutenant István Horthy (the son of the Hungarian regent Miklós Horthy), 37, serving as a fighter pilot with 1/1 Fighter Squadron of the Royal Hungarian Air Force is killed in Russia when his MÁVAG Héja ("Hawk"), "V.421", a Hungarian fighter based on the Reggiane Re.2000, crashes shortly after takeoff from an air field near Ilovskoye.

23 August
Boeing B-17E-BO Flying Fortress, 41-9091, c/n 2563, of the 427th Bomb Squadron, 303rd Bomb Group, operating out of Biggs Field, El Paso, Texas, suffers center fuselage failure in extremely bad weather 12 miles W of Las Cruces, New Mexico, only the radio operator and the engineering officer for the 427th Bomb Squadron, both in the radio room, survive by parachuting. Pilot was James E. Hudson. The 303rd BG was due to deploy overseas from Biggs on 24 August.

25 August
The Prince George, Duke of Kent (George Edward Alexander Edmund; 20 December 1902 – 25 August 1942) is killed while a passenger on a Short Sunderland Mk.III flying boat, W4026, 'DQ-M', of No. 228 Squadron RAF. Thirteen of 14 on board killed including the Duke of Kent, three members of his staff, pilot Flt. Lt. Frank Goyen, Wing Cmdr. Moseley, and six other crew. Tail gunner Sgt. Andrew Jack was thrown clear of the wreckage in his turret, suffering burns and other injuries. The plane was en route from Evanton, Ross-shire to Iceland, and then on to the Dominion of Newfoundland. The four-engined Sunderland struck Eagle's Rock near Morven, Caithness but the accident was never fully explained and several conspiracy theories have been circulated regarding the accident and Prince George's mission. Sole survivor Jack refused to discuss the accident throughout his life, fuelling the conspiracies.

30 August
General Aircraft Owlet, DP240, ex-G-AGBK, a tandem two-seat primary trainer with tricycle landing gear, impressed by the RAF to train Douglas Boston pilots with tricycle landing gear techniques. The Owlet, of No. 605 (County of Warwick) Squadron RAF at RNAS Ford, crashed this date near Arundel, Sussex.

4 September
On the night of 4–5 September, Handley Page Hampden AE436, of No. 144 Squadron RAF crashes on the remote Tsatsa Mountain in Sweden while en route from RAF Sumburgh in the Shetland Isles to Afrikanda air base, Northern Russia, after being forced down to lower altitude by an overheating engine. Pilot Officer D.I. Evans and passenger Corporal B.J. Sowerby survive with only slight injuries, three other members of crew die. Evans and Sowerby take three days to cross mountains and reach the village of Kvikkvokk, ~20 miles (32 km) to the south east. Wreckage of the Hampden is re-discovered by three girl hikers at 5,000 ft (1,500 m) in August 1976, with remains of dead crew-members still in wreckage.

10 September
No. 422 Squadron RCAF, temporarily operating Saro Lerwick flying boats cast off from No. 4 Operational Training Unit (4 OTU) while awaiting arrival of Short Sunderlands, suffers loss of L7267 this date when Plt. Off. Hoare crashes on landing at Lough Erne in good weather, airframe breaks up and sinks, but crew escapes safely. This is the final Lerwick write-off as the type is withdrawn from operation, remaining airframes sent to Scottish Aviation in November 1942 for reduction to salvage. Operations were generally not successful, with negligible contributions to the U-boat war. None now exist.

B-17F, Serial No. 41-24626, 324BS, 91BG, Pilot, Pinneo, Richard, E, out of Geiger Field WA, crashed into ridge located 25 miles SE of Enterprise Oregon, killing all aboard.

12 September
Martin-Baker MB-3, R2492, prototype fighter crashes on its tenth flight after its engine seized shortly after takeoff from RAF Wing at a height of no more than 100 ft (30 m). A crank on one of the Napier Sabre II's sleeve valves had failed. While trying to land in a field, Captain Valentine Baker (Company manager, aircraft-designer and test pilot) was forced to turn to port to avoid a farmhouse, a wing clipped a tree stump, the fighter cartwheeled and burst into flame, killing him.

15 September
Vultee XA-31B-VU Vengeance, 42-35824, piloted by H. H. Sargent Jr., out of Rentschler Field, Connecticut, overturns in a tobacco field while making forced landing near Windsor Locks, Connecticut, after engine failure. Initially built as a non-flying XA-31A engine-test airframe but later upgraded for operation.

20 September
Lt. Burton W. Basten, pilot, of Placentia, California, is killed in the crash of Martin B-26A-1 Marauder, 41-7459, of the 474th Bomb Squadron, 335th Bomb Group, Barksdale Field, Louisiana, when the bomber suffers a stall/spin crash 4 miles W of Plain Dealing, Louisiana. Airframe condemned at Barksdale Field on 24 September. Basten is buried in Fullerton, California, on 26 September. He graduated from Redlands High School, Redlands, California.

21 September
During flight back home from its bombing mission in Munich an Avro Lancaster Mk.I squadron code QR and serial number W4166 was shot down above Cochem in the night from 20 to 21 September 1942. The aircraft was hit high likely by a German Messerschmitt Bf 110 from the Nachtjagdgeschwader 4 based in Metz. All seven crewmembers were killed when the airplane all ablaze (according to an eyewitness) crashed down. The crewmembers were Sgt R.R.B.Owen RAAF KIA (Pilot), Sgt T.Thompson KIA (Mechanic), P/O W.H.Donovan RCAF KIA (Navigator), F/S J.O.Tuller RCAF KIA (Bombardier), Sgt D.T.McLean RAAF KIA (Radio-Operator), Sgt A.G.Sale KIA (Upper Turret) and Sgt P.J.Maxwell KIA (Tailgunner). They were first buried honorably with a salute in the presence of German and English government representatives in Cochem, later the remains were brought to the Rheinberg War Cemetery, Coll. grave 9. H. 18-22 (5), 9. H. 16 (1), 9. H. 17 (1). This aircraft was one of 450 Manchesters ordered from A.V.Roe Chadderton Jan. 1940 of which 207 were built as Lancaster Mk.1s, delivered from July 1942 to Nov. 1942 initially fitted with Merlin 20 engines. W4166 was delivered to 61 Squadron 31. August 1942. W4166 also took part in the key Raids against Bremen 13/14 Sep. 1942 and Essen 16/17 Sep. 1942. When lost this aircraft had only 23 flying hours.

24 September
Eight fliers are killed, four officers and four cadet bombardiers, when their two Beechcraft AT-11 Kansans bombing trainers collide over a target and burn during training out of Williams Field, Arizona. The Williams Field public relations office said that a commercial transport sighted and reported the wreckage. The bombing range was about six miles SE of Florence, Arizona. Victims of the accident were identified as Lt. William P. Owen, 24, Magnolia, Arkansas; Lt. Donald J. Gibson, 24, Valley City, North Dakota; Lt. Robert T. Ross, 20, Port Huron, Michigan; Lt. William B. Shea, 23, Kansas City; Cadets Robert E. Coate, 19, Woonsocket, Rhode Island; Mathew F. Farrell, 25, Lynn, Massachusetts; Wilbur C. Harter, 24, Delaware, Ohio; and John H. Cwik, 27, Johnstown, Pennsylvania. AT-11, 41-27630, piloted Lt. Shea, and AT-11, 41-27620, piloted by Lt. Gibson, both of the 537th School Squadron, were the airframes involved.

26 September
A USAAF Martin B-26B Marauder, 41-17767, of the 437th Bomb Squadron, 319th Bomb Group, out of Baer Field, Fort Wayne, Indiana, explodes in mid-air and crashes to earth two miles N of Rimer, Ohio, killing its crew of seven. Public relations officers at Baer Field said that the victims were: 2d Lt.s Eugene L. Newton, Kansas City, Missouri,| pilot, and Fred Bice, Tuscaloosa, Alabama, co-pilot; Tech/Sgt. A. J. Lamison, Three Springs, Pennsylvania; Staff Sgt. P. J. Nelligan, Santa Rosa, California; and Pvts. O. R. Colestock, Hecla, South Dakota; A. A. Wildt, Broadmead, Oregon; and R. D. Risepter, Radcliffe, Iowa.

30 September
Two pilots are killed and two injured when Lockheed P-38G-5-LO Lightning, 42-12854, piloted by William C. McConnell, by one source, or William M. McConnell, by another, taking off from the Lockheed Air Terminal, Burbank, California, on a test flight, swerves out of control, plows through several parked training planes, ignites, and damages a hangar of the Pacific Airmotive Company. McConnell, of San Fernando, California, a Lockheed test pilot for about two years, is killed. "The other pilot killed was identified from papers on his body as Eddie C. Wike, of Sharon, Conn., student flier from Ryan Aeronautical school at Hemet, who was near the group of parked training planes when the accident occurred. The two injured men were John Waide, Ryan instructor from Hemet, and Harold Keefe of Hollywood, representative of an airplane engine company." Parked aircraft damaged or destroyed were Ryan PT-22s, 41-15341, 41-15610, 41-20852, and a fourth with an incorrectly recorded serial that ties up to an AT-6A-NT Texan rather than the reported PT-22.

30 September
"Hondo, Texas, Sept. 30 – Two officers and two enlisted men were killed in an airplane accident near the A.A.F. navigation school here. The dead included Capt. John G. Rafferty, 40, Monrovia, California." Lockheed A-28A-LO Hudson, 42-46980, of the 846th School Squadron, Hondo Army Airfield Navigation School, Texas, crashed 2.5 miles E – 1.5 mile N of the base due to a spin / stall after takeoff. Capt. Rafferty was the pilot.

October
DAR 10 (ДАР-10), light bomber and reconnaissance aircraft, one of only two prototypes, crashes this month (Darzhavna Aeroplanna Rabotilnica – State Airplane Workshop) (Bekas – snipe). In spite of good flight reviews, the type was not chosen for production and the high-wing Kaproni Bulgarski KB-11 Fazan was selected for production instead.

October
Early production Messerschmitt Me 163B Komet being test flown by renowned pre-war glider and test pilot Hanna Reitsch, from Obertraubling, near Regensburg, while on unpowered flight towed by Messerschmitt Bf 110, jettisoning of take-off dolley at 30 ft (9.1 m) altitude fails, causing severe juddering of airframe. Bf 110 tows Reitsch to height of 10,500 ft (3,200 m) and Reitsch casts off. Despite violent maneuvering to try to shake off dolly, which also fails, Reitsch decides to attempt landing in order to save aircraft. On approach to field, sideslipping to lose height, the unfuelled Me 163 stalls at a higher than normal airspeed, due to disturbed airflow caused by wheels of dolly. Komet impacts ground and somersaults. Although conscious immediately after the crash, Reitsch passes out as rescuers arrive. She is taken to the Hospital of the Sisters of Mercy, Regensburg, where she is discovered to be suffering from skull fractures in four places, compression of the brain, displacement of the upper jaw-bones, and separation of the bones of the nose. Regaining consciousness in hospital, she makes a slow recovery, being well enough to be discharged from hospital in March 1943. Shortly after the accident, Reitsch is awarded the Iron Cross, First Class.

1 October
The Associated Press reported from San Juan, Puerto Rico, that a USAAF transport had crashed in the mountains NW of the town of Coamo, in southern Puerto Rico, killing all 22 on board. "Names of the dead were not announced immediately pending notification of relatives in the United States. Several civilians were known to have been aboard. The plane crashed shortly after its takeoff. It took hours for a searching party working afoot in the difficult mountain country to locate the wreckage." Douglas C-39, 38-524, c/n 2081, of the 20th Troop Carrier Squadron, assigned at Losey Field, Puerto Rico, piloted by Francis H. Durant, crashed 15 mi NW of Coamo.

1 October
"VISALIA, Oct. 1 – Two Army aviation cadets and a civilian instructor were killed today in the mid-air collision of two primary training planes near Seville, five miles from their Sequoia field base. They were Cadets Mike Mumolo, 25, Los Angeles, and James Cameron Schwindt, 19, Santa Paul, and Instructor Edward Hedrick, 47, formerly of Ontario." Ryan PT-22s, 41-20658, flown by Schwindt, and 41-20661, flown by Mumolo, came down 7 mi E of Sequoia Field.

3 October
"Akron, Ohio, Oct. 3 – A medium Army bomber crashed near Akron airport tonight and airport officials said all seven occupants were killed. Guards at the Goodyear Aircraft Corp. reported one of the ship's motors failed immediately after the takeoff. The state highway patrol at Columbus listed three of the victims as Lieut, C. R. Jackson of Akron, pilot; Lieut. Thomas Schoefield, Providence, R. I., and Lieut. Ralph Shrigley, Rootstown, Ohio." B-26B, 41-17813, of the 442d Bomb Squadron, 320th Bomb Group, out of Baer Field, Ft. Wayne, Indiana. The pilot was listed in the accident report as Claude R. Jackson.

6 October
"Savannah, Ga., Oct. 6. – Five men stationed at Hunter field of the Savannah army air base were killed late today and a sixth was critically injured when the plane in which they were making a routine flight crashed over Camp Stewart." Lockheed B-34 Lexington, AJ420. of the 4th TTSq, Hunter Field, Savannah, suffered a forced landing following engine failure. Pilot was William L. Ineson. Aircraft was originally part of an RAF order for Lockheed Ventura IIs.

8 October
"Long Beach, Oct. 8 – Capt. Don E. Brown, 25, son of Actor Joe E. Brown, was killed in the crash of an army bomber near Palm Springs this afternoon. An announcement from ferrying command said 'Capt. Brown was on a routine flight from the Long Beach air base to Utah when the crash occurred nine miles north of Palm Springs. Brown was flying alone.' He was only recently promoted to a captaincy, after having been commissioned a second lieutenant in the air forces July 11, 1941, and had been attached to the Long Beach ferrying command base a little over a year. Capt. Brown was a student body president at the University of California at Los Angeles in 1939 and cadet colonel of the R.O.T.C., and a first string football player in 1938 and 1939. He received his air forces training at Ontario, Moffett field and Stockton". Douglas A-20B-DL Havoc, 41-3295, of the 1st Ferrying Squadron, 6th Ferrying Group, Long Beach AAF, crashed after takeoff due to engine failure. Word of the accident reached the actor just before his cue to go on in the stage performance in Detroit of "The Show-Off". In a break with the old tradition that "the show must go on", Brown left the theatre immediately and the performance was cancelled. "Don was my oldest son, but I have another who will take his place in a few weeks," said Brown. "He is Joe Jr., 20 years old, now employed in the Douglas aircraft factory. Joe has arranged to join the marines." Funeral services were held at Forest Lawn Memorial Park in Glendale on 11 October 1942. "'Well, it had to be my boy,' said Brown, met at the airport by his other son Joe, Jr. 'He was a man and he took it like a man, I know. And so will I.'"

8 October
"Halifax, N. S., Oct. 8 – Seven airmen are missing and believed killed after an R.A.F. [sic] plane crash in the Bay of Fundy at noon today." Lockheed Hudson Mk. III, RCAF BW700, taken on strength by Eastern Air Command, 25 March 1942, assigned to No. 36 Operational Training Unit at RCAF Station Greenwood, N. S. Still with this unit when it crashed near Port George, N. S. (on the Bay of Fundy, about 9 miles west of Greenwood) on 8 October 1942. Was reported missing on air to sea firing exercise, all crew missing, assumed killed. Ownership to No. 4 Repair Depot on 13 October 1942 for write off.

10 October
"Berkeley, Oct. 10. – A World war I airplane believed to be the first to carry airmail to San Francisco will be salvaged for scrap metal. Mrs. C. A. (Mother) Tusch, friend and confidante of many of America's most famous aviators, said she will donate the plane to the scrap drive. Her 'hangar' here is a museum for historical aeronautical relics. She also planned to contribute a German machine gun given her by a soldier in the first World war.".

11 October
The Dornier Do 217N V1 stalls with its undercarriage down and crashes into Müritz Lake, killing the crew.

11 October
Consolidated B-24D-1-CO Liberator, 41-23647, c/n 442, the eighth block 1 airframe, of the 469th Bomb Squadron, 333d Bomb Group, based at Topeka Army Airfield, Kansas, piloted by Ralph M. Dienst, suffers engine failure and crashes into a hillside three miles W of the base, killing eight and critically injuring one. "The plane was on a routine flight, army officers reported. Lt. H. R. Rubin of the Topeka base said the dead included: Lieut. Ralph M. Dienst, 26, Pasadena, California; Second Lieut. James H. Edwards, 24, Berkeley, California, and Second Lieut. James L. Holmes, 24, Fort Bragg, California."

12 October
"Los Angeles, Oct. 12. – Four barrage balloons of the army's coastal defense system broke from their moorings today, one falling in flames after its metal trailing cable struck a high tension wire. Two were later recaptured and the fourth continued to soar."

13 October
"AAF 201. The Pan American Air Ferries, Incorporated, has now furnished this office with all the available information relative to the disappearance of your brother... Senior Pilot Donald Mac Farrow and Navigator Joseph Henry Barenthaler departed from Accra, Gold Coast, British West Africa at 9:40 a.m., on 13 October 1942, in an A-20 aircraft from Kano, Nigeria, en route to the Middle East. Weather conditions on the day of the flight were overcast with rain and scattered thunderstorms between Accra and Lagos, Nigeria..." Plane last sighted going into a very bad thunderstorm while flying over the water. No wreckage reported by the Vichy French Government. No survivors found. Reference source: letter from Brigadier General Leon W. Johnson, Headquarters Army Air Forces written to Staff Sargeant Robert C. Farrow, Public Relations Office, 554th AAF Base Unit, 4th Ferrying Group, FD, ATC, Memphis 2, Tennessee.

13 October
"Seattle, Oct. 13. – An army barrage balloon broke from its moorings in the Puget sound area today and swept over Seattle, starting a fire, breaking power and telephone wires, and disrupting transit system service. The balloon was brought to a halt about an hour after breaking away. A thousand feet of cable dragging from beneath the balloon caused the damage."

14 October
The apparent mid-air explosion and crash of Beechcraft AT-11 Kansan, 41-27447, of the 383d School Squadron, out of Kirtland Field, four miles W of Belen, New Mexico, kills three crew. "The dead, as released by the Albuquerque air base: Second Lieut. Boyd C. Knetsar, the pilot, of Houston, Texas, and Aviation Cadets John Joseph Fischer, Detroit, and Earl William Ferris, St. Louis."

15 October
Douglas C-49E-DO Skytrain, 42-43619, DST-114, c/n 1494, ex-American Airlines Douglas Sleeper Transport NC14988, A115 "Texas", first flown as X14988 on 17 December 1935; sold to TWA, 14 March 1942, as line number 361; commandeered by USAAF, 31 March 1942; assigned to the 24th Troop Carrier Squadron, crashed this date in bad weather at Knob Noster, Missouri. Another source gives crash location as 2.5 mi SW of Chicago Municipal Airport, Illinois. An Associated Press item states that the transport crashed and burned on a prairie about two miles W of the municipal airport on Chicago's southwest side, the public relations office for the Sixth Service Command announced. The two crew and seven passengers were all killed.

15 October
Nine men are killed when Boeing B-17E-BO Flying Fortress, 41-9161, of the 459th Bomb Squadron, 330th Bombardment Group, Alamogordo, New Mexico, piloted by John R. Pratt, crashes into Magdalena Peak, 6 miles SE of Magdalena, New Mexico. Forest Ranger Arthur Gibson reported the crash.

16 October
North American B-25C-1 Mitchell, 41-13206, operated by the USAAF 5th Ferrying Group, Air Transport Command, piloted by Captain James M. Treweek, is on a routine flight from Rosecrans Field, St. Joseph, Missouri, to Dallas Love Field when bad weather closes airfield and controllers advise crew to divert. Pilot heads west, presumably bound for Meacham Field, flying below 500 ft (152 m) altitude to stay in visual conditions under low cloud deck. As bomber nears Grapevine, Texas, a wingtip and aileron are sliced off by a guy-wire of WFAA radio tower, causing pilot to lose control; all 6 crew-members die in subsequent crash. Also killed in the crash was, Colonel Edward Standifer Fee of Little Rock, Arkansas, Corporal Joseph L. Tyndall, Captain Louis M. Rawlins, Jr., of Baltimore, Maryland, Staff Sergeant Wilfred E. Miller of Washington D.C., and Private William A. Echko of Lorain, Ohio.

18 October

Vickers Wellington Mk.IC, T2564, 'KX-T', of No. 311 Squadron RAF, Coastal Command, Royal Air Force, based at RAF Talbenny, Wales, crashes at 16:08 near Ruislip station while on approach to RAF Northolt, England, killing all 15 on board and six on the ground (including four children).

21 October
Boeing B-17D Flying Fortress, 40-3089, of the 5th Bomb Group/11th Bombardment Group Heavy (H), with Captain Eddie Rickenbacker, America's top-scoring World War I ace (26 kills), aboard on a secret mission, is lost at sea in the central Pacific Ocean when the bomber goes off-course. After 24 days afloat, Rickenbacker and surviving crew are rescued by the U.S. Navy after having been given up for lost and discovered by a Vought-Sikorsky OS2U Kingfisher crew.

23 October

Mid-air collision at 9,000 feet (2,700 m) altitude between American Airlines Douglas DC-3, NC16017, "Flagship Connecticut", flying out of Lockheed Air Terminal (now Burbank Airport) en route to Phoenix, Arizona, and New York City, and USAAF Lockheed B-34 Ventura II bomber, 41-38116, on a ferry flight from Long Beach Army Air Base to Palm Springs Army Air Field. Pilot of B-34, Lt. William N. Wilson and copilot Staff Sergeant Robert Leicht, were able to make emergency landing at Palm Springs, but DC-3, carrying nine passengers and a crew of three, its tail splintered and its rudder shorn off by B-34's right engine, went into a flat spin, clipped a rocky ledge in Chino Canyon, California, below San Jacinto Peak, and exploded in desert, killing all on board. Among the passengers killed was Academy Award-winning Hollywood composer Ralph Rainger, 41, who had written or collaborated on such hit songs as "Louise", "Love in Bloom" (comedian Jack Benny's theme song), "Faithful Forever", "June in January", "Blue Hawaii" and "Thanks for the Memory", which entertainer Bob Hope adopted as his signature song. Initial report by Ventura crew was that they had lost sight of the airliner due to smoke from a forest fire, but closed-door Congressional investigation revealed that bomber pilot knew the first officer on the DC-3, Louis Frederick Reppert, and had attempted to wave to him in mid-air rendezvous. However, Wilson misjudged the distance between the two aircraft and triggered the fatal collision when, in pulling his B-34 up and away from the DC-3, its right propeller sliced through the airliner's tail. The Civil Aeronautics Board (CAB) placed the blame directly on the "reckless and irresponsible conduct of Lieutenant William N. Wilson in deliberately maneuvering a bomber in dangerous proximity to an airliner in an unjustifiable attempt to attract the attention of the first officer (copilot) of the latter plane." Lt. Wilson subsequently faced manslaughter charges by the U.S. Army but about a month after the accident a court martial trial board acquitted him of blame. In a separate legal development, a lawsuit seeking $227,637 was filed against American Airlines on behalf of crash victim Ralph Rainger's wife, Elizabeth, who was left widowed with three small children. In June 1943 a jury awarded her $77,637. The Ventura, repaired, and eventually modified to a RB-34A-4 target-tug, would crash at Wolf Hill near Smithfield, Rhode Island, after engine failure on 5 August 1943, killing all three crew.

25 October
The Dornier Do 217H V2 suffers propeller failure and crashes, severely injuring the crew.

Late October
Second prototype Messerschmitt Me 262 V2, PC+UB, first flown 1 October 1942, is damaged when pilot strikes ground vehicle with starboard wing during flight preparations, due to restricted visibility from cockpit in tail-dragger configuration of early 262s. Aircraft repaired.

2 November
A Boeing B-17C Flying Fortress, 40-2047, c/n 2117, breaks apart in the air near Tells Peak, California, while en route to Sacramento for an overhaul of the number 3 (starboard inner) engine. Pilot 1st Lieutenant Leo M. H. Walker dies, but the other eight crew members survive.

6 November
Grumman UC-103, 42-97044, former civilian Grumman G-32 Gulfhawk III, ex-NC1051, built for the Gulf Oil Refining Company, delivered 6 May 1938 and impressed by the USAAF in November 1942, used as VIP ferry aircraft, 427th Air Base Squadron, Homestead Army Air Field, force-lands in the southern Florida Everglades with engine failure: written off.

18 November
In a typical wartime training accident, a Beechcraft AT-7 Navigator, 41-21079, c/n 1094, of the 341st School Squadron, crashes in the Mendel Glacier (one source says Darwin Glacier) in California's Kings Canyon National Park. The four-member training flight left Mather Field in Sacramento, California, and was never heard from again. On 24 September 1947, a hiker discovered wreckage of the plane on a glacier in Kings Canyon. On 16 October 2005, a climber on the Mendel Glacier discovered a body believed to be one of the crew members. He was later identified as Leo M. Mustonen, 22, of Brainerd, Minnesota. The others were John M. Mortenson, 25, of Moscow, Idaho; William R. Gamber, 23, of Fayette, Ohio; and Ernest G. Munn of St. Clairsville, Ohio. A second body was found under receding snow in 2007 and was identified Ernest G. Munn.

19/20 November
Two British Airspeed Horsa gliders on a top-secret mission (Operation Freshman) to destroy the Vemork Norsk Hydro chemical plant in Norway, which at the time was developing heavy water (deuterium oxide) for Hitler's Atomic bomb, crashed in Norway, killing eleven men outright, with the survivors being captured and executed soon after the crash under direct orders from Hitler.

27 November
Douglas O-46A, 35–179, of the 81st Air Base Squadron, piloted by Gordon H. Fleisch, lands downwind at Brooks Field, Harlingen, Texas, runs out of runway, overturns. Written off, it is abandoned in place. More than twenty years later it is discovered by the Antique Airplane Association with trees growing through its wings, and in 1967 it is rescued and hauled to Ottumwa, Iowa. Restoration turns out to beyond the organization's capability, and in September 1970 it is traded to the National Museum of the United States Air Force for a flyable C-47. The (then) Air Force Museum has it restored at Purdue University and places it on display in 1974, the sole survivor of the 91 O-46s built.

Post-November
Henschel Hs 130E V2, high-altitude reconnaissance and bomber design, first flown in November 1942, is lost on its seventh flight due to an engine fire. Replaced in testing by the V3. Type is never accepted for production.
13 December
Canadian Test Observer Harry Griffiths, 20, fell through the floor of a bombsight in a Boston Bomber. Thankfully, American Test Pilot Sid Gerow, 29, flew the plane over the frozen Lake St. Louis. Griffiths let go and glided across the surface for 1 km, surviving with only minor frostbite and severe bruising.

26 December
"Second Lt. Henry P. Perchal, 23 years old, son of Mr. and Mrs. Edward Perchal, 3460 North Laramie avenue, is one of eight men aboard an army medium bomber missing since last Saturday night on a flight from Barksdale field, near Shreveport, La., to its base at Walterboro, S. C." B-25C Mitchell, 41-12630, of the 489th Bomb Squadron (Medium), 340th Bomb Group (Medium), from Walterboro Army Airfield, piloted by Fred M. Hampton, crashes in Lafourche Swamp, Louisiana.

28 December
Martin B-26B-4 Marauder, 41-18101, of the 496th Bomb Squadron, 344th Bomb Group, Drane Field, Lakeland Army Air Base#2, Lakeland, Florida, piloted by William A. Booth, with six on board, departs Tampa for San Antonio, Texas, and vanishes over the Gulf of Mexico. Aboard as passengers are Women's Army Auxiliary Corps Third Officer Eleanor C. Nate, 36, 631 Central Avenue, Wilmette, Illinois, and her husband, Maj. Joseph C. Nate. "Third Officer Nate, who is a recruiting officer at San Antonio, was en route to her post after spending a Christmas leave with her husband and her brother, Capt. John M. Campbell, in Tampa. Maj. Nate was accompanying her."

29 December
"Pensacola, Fla., December 30, (AP) – Two Pensacola pilots are presumed to have been killed Tuesday night, it was announced by naval officials here tonight. They were Ensign Sylvain Bouche of New Orleans, La., and Cadet John T. Greer of Tamaqua, Pa."

30 December
North American B-25D-1 Mitchell, 41-29855, of the 498th Bomb Squadron, 345th Bomb Group, flown by Frank E. Mason, crashes 1½ miles from Columbia Army Air Base, South Carolina. Three officers and two enlisted men are killed in the late Wednesday takeoff accident.

30 December
A flying instructor and two cadets are killed in the collision of two Vultee BT-13A Valiants shortly after their takeoffs from Waco Army Air Field, Texas. BT-13A, 41-21734, of the 470th Basic Flight Training Squadron, flown by cadet Paul G. Shudick, and BT-13A, 41-22734, of the 468th Basic Flight Training Squadron, piloted by Lt. James A. Abney, crash killing Abney, of Shreveport, Louisiana, cadet Shudick, Gary, Indiana, and cadet William H. Turner, Burton, Texas.

30 December
Boeing B-17F-35-BO Flying Fortress, 42-5123, of the 20th Bomb Squadron, 2d Bomb Group, Great Falls Army Air Base, Montana, piloted by Edward T. Layfield, crashes near Musselshell, Montana. Capt. John Lloyd, public relations officer at the Great Falls base, said that eleven aboard were killed.

30 December
A U.S. Navy patrol bomber on a routine training flight crashes Sunday afternoon in the north end of the Salton Sea in the Imperial Valley, California, killing seven crew and injuring two. The Eleventh Naval District at San Diego identifies the dead as: Lt. William O. Carlson, plane commander, Seattle, Washington; Lt. Jack E. Brenner, pilot, Coronado, California; Ens. J. Douglas Simmons III, pilot, Cleveland, Mississippi; W. A. Morgan, aviation machinist's mate, San Diego; Louis J. Hanlon, aviation machinist's mate first class, Coronado; J. W. Jones, aviation ordnanceman second class, Utica, New York; J. J. O'Connor, aviation radioman third class, Denver, Colorado. "All bodies were recovered. No other details were made public."

30 December
"San Francisco, December 30 – Four army fighter planes crashed within a 12-hour span in the San Francisco bay area today. Three of the pilots were believed killed. Two of the ships plunged to earth near Hamilton field, one ten miles north of Napa and the other just south of the field. Another crashed and exploded in a salt pond near Newark in southern Alameda county and the fourth crashed in Lake Chabot in the east Oakland foothills. Hamilton field, which announced all four mishaps, said the victim of the crash nearest the field was Second Lieut. Lloyd E. Blythe, 24, of Oakland. Second Lieut. Howard B. Stivers (home address not given) rode his plane to earth as it fell in Lake Chabot and was rescued uninjured. The pilots of the other two single-seaters were not identified immediately."

Blythe (also reported with middle initial G) was killed flying Bell P-39D-1-BE Airacobra, 41-28302, of the 326th Fighter Squadron, 328th Fighter Group, Hamilton Field.

== See also ==
- List of accidents and incidents involving military aircraft

== Bibliography ==
- Martin, Bernard. The Viking, Valetta and Varsity. Tonbridge, Kent, UK: Air-Britain (Historians) Ltd., 1975. ISBN 978-0-85130-038-2.
- Bodie, Warren M. (1991). The Lockheed P-38 Lightning. Hayesville, North Carolina: Widewing Publications. pp. 72–167. ISBN 978-0-9629359-5-4.
