= Scout and Sniper Company (6th Marine Division) =

The Scout and Sniper Company of 6th Marine Division was the division reconnaissance asset for the regimental commanders. It was created by former Marine Raider Major Anthony "Cold Steel" Walker to form a scout company from Company H from out of one of the regiments of 6th Marine Division. The Scout Company deactivated, along with 6th Marine Division, after the end of World War II.

== History ==
=== World War II ===
==== Okinawa Islands, April 1945 ====
On 1 April 1945, the 6th Marine Division, commanded by Major General Lemuel Shepherd, landed on Okinawa —codenamed ICEBERG. Landing north over Hagushi RED and GREEN beaches, 22nd and 29th Marine Regiments moved inland and seized Yontan airfield.

MGen. Lem Shepherd sent orders to former Raider company commander (then) Major Anthony Walker to take command of 140 Marines to form the 6th Marine Division's scout company from Company H of 29th Marine Regiment.

MGen Shepherd gave the lightly weaponed recon Marines transportation by tanks, it gave the company firepower plus the ability to swiftly send the recon Marines ahead of the forward line of their own troops (FLOT) uncovering any major Japanese defensive positions. Occasionally, they had encountered superior Japanese forces and would pull back and report their findings to MGen Shepherd. The expedient reconnaissance-in-force allowed MGen Shepherd to coordinate accordingly and send in his infantry regiments, supported by artillery, air and naval gunfire support to overwhelm the Japanese defenders.

===== Northern Okinawa =====
The Company H (Scout)'s objectives were to reconnoiter up the western coastal road of the Zampa Misaki Cape while being mounted on tanks. They moved out one thousand yards up the cape by end of the day. The next morning on L+1, they informed the 22nd Marines and the regiment moved north and seized the remainder of the cape. During that same day, Walker's scout company, again mounted on tanks, pushed north from Kurawa across the cape and seized the small town of Nahahama. This effectively cut off the base of the Zampa Misaki Peninsula. By 3 April, L+2, the 6th Marine Division cross the isthmus along the Nagahama-Ishikawa lines, sealing off all Japanese north of the FLOT. Meanwhile, on the same day of 3 April 1945, 1st Marine Division sent their scout company front of their zone of action along the boundary of the 6th Marine Division to their north.

In the next few days, 6th Marine Division continued north, reaching the port town of Nago on the west coast. Underwater Demolition Teams and minesweepers were tasked to clear the port of mines and underwater obstacles to allow seaborne delivery of logistic support. On 6 April, Company H (Scout) was assigned to mop-up bypassed Japanese troops in the area between the Ishikawa Isthmus line and the Yakada-Yaka line.

The III Amphibious Corps next objective were to advance north up Okinawa, and the majority of the Japanese 44th Independent Mixed Brigade had withdrawn to the mountains on the peninsula at center of the island, mostly to the formidable twelve-hundred-foot hill called Yae-Take. The Japanese brigade elements included two battalions, an anti-tank and a regimental gun company totaling over 2,000 of Japanese troops defending the Motobu, fortifying their defenses along Yae-Take with salvaged 75-mm artillery and 150-mm guns and 16.1-inch naval guns from sunken or air-damaged Japanese ships.

Major Walker's tank-mounted company scouted ahead of the 29th Marine Regiment, patrolling up the west coast road out of Nago and reached the coastal town of Awa. After finding only little resistance, they returned to Nago. Advanced along the northeast side of Motobu, across the base of peninsula, the recon company encountered heavier Japanese resistance at the town of Nakasona. On 9 April 1945, 2nd Battalion of 29th Marines used Walker's scouts' route along to set up Nakasoni and Unten by the following day on 10 April.

Walker's Company returned to the west coast of the Motobu Peninsula and continued their recon patrol ahead of 29th Marines. They came across bridges blown by fleeing Japanese forces slowing down their patrol until division combat engineers came and either rebuilt the bridges or made alternative bypasses. On 11 April, as they were in the town of Toguchi, they received further orders to push all the way to the tip of Motobu along the coastal road and secure the town of Bise and as contingently guard against any Japanese forces concluding to counter-attack from seaward. The capture of Bise on 12 April proved the possible emplacement of radar-warning stations for any eventual incoming kamikaze attacks. Major General Shepherd then tasked 6th Division's scout company to reinforce Company F, 2nd Battalion of 29th Marines with Major Walker assuming command, and the responsibility of Bise.

The FMFPAC attached the Amphibious Reconnaissance Battalion, led by Major James Jones, to the III Amphibious Corps to assist the 6th Marine Division in reconnoitering and seizing three small islands lying off the Motobu coast that was reported to be defended by the Japanese or Okiwanan Boeitai (similar to the organization of the United States National Guard). On the nights of 19–20 April, the Amphib Recon Battalion secured Sesoko Shima and Yagachi Shima while the remainder of the 6th Marine Division wrapped up its reduction of Yae-Take and 29th Marines were moving north, declaring Motobu Peninsula secured on the same day of 20 April. The next following day on 21 April Major Walker and his Scouts landed on Kouri Shima using LVTs and using LVT(A)s to provide his recon Marines fire support. The northern portion of Okinawa was declared secured on 21 April 1945. The III AC's 1st and 6th Marine Divisions moved south to join the Army's XXIV Corps's attack on the southern portion of main island of Okinawa.

===== Southern Okinawa =====
The Marine leaders, foreseeing an avoidable high casualty rate, strongly recommended to continue the usage of the III AC's amphibious landing asset for the assault on the southern end of the islands of Okinawa in the ICEBERG Operation. However, Army General Simon Buckner declined the recommendation and elected instead to put both of the III AC's divisions into the army infantry lines. The result led to the Japanese counterlandings off the west coast on the nights of 14–15 May when the 22nd Marines were tasked to seize the heights about the northern edge of the city of Naha. Navy patrol crafts and other vessels in the area managed to break of the attack. The coast received no further threats when General Shepherd reinforced the 22nd Marine Regiment with Major Walker's 6th Division scout company along the coast.

By 25 May 1945, the 6th Marine Division were within the Naha city limits at a 20-yard wide canal that connected Kokuba Estuary and the Asato River to the west, bisecting the city. Major Walker's Company crossed the Asato River through thick mud and three- to five-feet stone banks and penetrated deep into the western portion of Naha City. Marine combat engineers were opposed by enemy snipers and the recon company dug-in without packs and their gear to advance their position, quickly subduing the snipers. It allowed the Marine engineers, the next following morning to complete a bridge across the mouth of the Asato River.

On 27 May, one company of 2nd Battalion from 22nd Marines crossed the Asato and pressed deeper into the western part of Naha, passing through the lines of the Walker's Company. Most of the Japanese counterattacks throughout the night were broken up by artillery and the Marines in the line, while the Marines and the Army pushed south. Meanwhile, the 22nd Marines moved into western Naha. In order to relieve the 22nd Marines for further use on the battlefield, General Shepherd tasked Major Walker and his recon Marines to take over the western portions of Naha. The 6th Marine Division's recon company relieved the 22nd Marines, and advanced toward the Kokuba estuary, reaching it at 0900. The 29th Marines came to the line to relieve the 4th Marine Regiment.

General Lemuel Shepherd estimated that the best way to capture all of Naha City and its airfield was to seize and occupy the Oruku Peninsula, by a shore to shore amphibious assault. After Shepherd gained recommendations from both the III Marines Amphibious Corps and the Tenth Army, he ordered Major Anthony Walker and his company to scout any enemy presence in the dictated area and report back any findings.

Under the cover of darkness Walker and his recon Marines landed onto the shores of Oruku on the night of 1–2 June, infiltrating through the northern portion of the peninsula. They instantly became under hostile enemy fire. Despite their situation, they managed to uncover hasty intelligence from the enemy by listening and observing their activity in the area. Reporting their return, they found that the beaches were defended but not in great strength; making it usable for LVTs to land.

On 3 June 1945, east of the Naha City and Oruku Peninsula operations, Major General Pedro del Valle, commanding general of 1st Marine Division, sent 1st Lieutenant Powell and the division's Scout Company to spearhead the attacks of Colonel Edward Snedeker's 7th Marine Regiment. The recon Marines uncovered the enemy defenses while approaching Kokuba Estuary, and 7th Marines swiftly seized the area.

By 5 June, the 4th Marines boarded their LVTs near Machinato airfield and landed by amphibious assault on the northern flank of the Japanese defenses and established a beachhead. Meanwhile, Walker's Company simultaneously seized Ona Yama Island in the middle of Naha Harbor. Ten days later, the 1st Marine Division seized the Oruku Peninsula, eliminating the Japanese Special Naval Landing Force commanded by Rear Admiral Minoru Ota.

===== The Offshore Islands =====
After four days of intensive bombardment from pre-landing preparatory fire, Major Walker and Company H (Scout) were tasked in assessing the bombardment damage. On 13–14 June, Walker's Company, reinforced with a rifle company from 1st Battalion, 9th Marines, landed on the small and rocky island of Senaga Shima, one of the islets off the coast of Oruku Peninsula, using LVTs. They reported nothing but dead Japanese and destroyed facilities from the naval gunfire. This became the last recon activity for Walker's 6th Marine Division scout company during the war. Meanwhile, Jones's FMFPAC Amphib Recon Battalion were reconnoitering and securing the western islands offshore from the main island of Okinawa.

The landing force commander Brig. General Leroy Hunt, the 2nd Marine Division's assistant division commander landed his 8th Marines ashore Iheya Shima on 3 June after pre-bombardment and air strikes and declared it secured. Although no presence of Japanese, they sustained minor casualties from ill-guided rockets and shells falling short during the friendly-fire preparatory naval gunfire bombardments.

The 2nd Marine Division's Scout Company reconnoitered Izena Jima during the night of 23 —24 June 1945, only locating some 3,000 to 4,000 Okinawa citizens; but no enemy defenses or Japanese defenders. The citizens were quickly processed by military government civil affairs teams.
