= United States Marine Corps Amphibious Reconnaissance Battalion =

US military unit

FMF Amphibious Reconnaissance Battalion
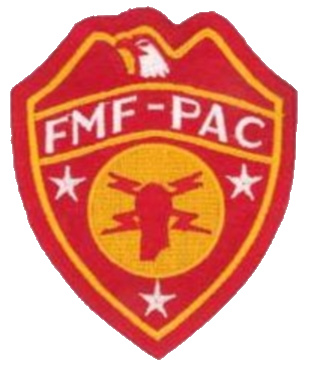
- Shoulder sleeve insignia for FMF-PAC Signal troops which was utilized by early reconnaissance units.
- Active: January 7, 1943 – June 19, 1957
- Country: United States
- Branch: United States Marine Corps
- Type: Special operations capable forces
- Size: Battalion (Formerly company)
- Part of: Amphibious Corps, Pacific Fleet (ACPF) (January 1943–August 1943); V Amphibious Corps (August 1943–April 1944); Fleet Marine Force(April 1944 – 19 June 1957)
- Nickname: "Jones's Group" (World War II-era)
- Patron: James L. Jones Sr. Observer Group
- Mottos: Celer, Silens, Mortalis ("Swift, Silent, Deadly")
- Colors: Marine Corps Colors
- Engagements: World War II

The United States Marine Corps's Amphibious Reconnaissance Battalion, formerly Company, was a Marine Corps special operations capable forces of United States Marine and Hospital corpsman that performed clandestine operation preliminary pre–D-Day amphibious reconnaissance of planned beachheads and their littoral area within uncharted enemy territory for the joint-Navy/Marine force commanders of the Pacific Fleet during World War II. Often accompanied by Navy Underwater Demolition Teams and the early division recon companies, these amphibious recon platoons performed more reconnaissance missions (over 150) than any other single recon unit during the Pacific War.

They are amongst the patriarch lineage of the Force Reconnaissance companies which still continue providing force-level reconnaissance for the latter Fleet Marine Force. Their countless efforts have contributed to the success of the joint-Marines/Army maritime landing forces assigned under the Navy fleet commanders during the island-hopping campaigns of the numerous atolls in the Pacific.

Their trademark of amphibious warfare techniques utilized insertion methods under the cover of darkness by rubber boats, patrol torpedo boats, Catalina flying boats, converted high speed destroyer transport ships, or APDs, and submarines for troop transports. These Marines applied skills in topographic and hydrographic surveys by charting and measuring water depths, submerged coral heads, and terrain inland; taking photographs and soil samples for permeability for amphibious tractors and landing craft parties.

Their assignments included artillery observer, clandestine operation, commando style raids in difficult to reach terrain (e.g. coastal, mountain forest), long-range penetration, military intelligence gathering, and reconnoitering or scouting a planned or potential landing site. These teams also evaluated the beaches looking for exits off the hostile beaches inland, for contingency measures if the Marine landing force were to necessitate a retreat. Most importantly, they compromised the locations of enemy forces, their strengths and weakness, and other importance in the follow-up of an amphibious assault.

== Early history ==
The United States' earliest doctrine in amphibious reconnaissance was introduced by naval intelligence officer Major Dion Williams, who divided preliminary reconnaissance between those concerned with the sea to the shoreline to be conducted by the naval beach demolition units, and those concerned with the beach and adjacent land, the recon Marines. Technical expertise was required in surveying, cartography, and recording observations, as well the ability to interpret various types of hydrographic and topological data from previous surveys.

Dion Williams stated—

"In order to prepare intelligent plans for the attack or defense of a harbor or bay, it is necessary to have at hand a comprehensive description of the hydrographic features and accurate charts showing the depths of water at all points, the reefs, rocks, shoals, and peculiar currents which constitute dangers to navigation, and the tributary streams and channels which may form avenues of attack or furnish anchorages for a portion of the floating defenses or auxiliaries of the defenders."

American naval doctrine of 1927 continued to emphasize reconnaissance for planning as well as reconnaissance to verify the soundness of formulated plans and reconnaissance during the last phases. This three-stage concept of intelligence gathering remained in effect throughout World War II when the V Amphibious Corps directive listed the following phases of reconnaissance:

1. Prior to the completion of operation plans for landing, information is sought for preparation of plans in sufficient time prior to the operation to avoid the loss of secrecy which may be incurred by reconnaissance executed shortly prior to an attack.
2. Between completion of plans for the landing and the actual embarkation of a landing force, further information necessary for the execution of the plan is collected such as late data on the enemy's strength arid dispositions.
3. During the last days prior to Zero-D-Day or further information is sought of the enemy's dispositions and strength as well as movement of his reserves.

Early reconnaissance activities were generally confined to surveys of various ports, uncharted islands and contiguous waters performed by officers qualified in survey technique. Some nautical charts to this date of infrequently encountered areas and islands still bear annotations indicating they were compiled by officers of various American ships. The duty of an intelligence officer aboard American ships was usually filled by the senior Marine Corps officer aboard.

The most profound war prophet that lived was perhaps Lt. Colonel Earl H. Ellis. Ellis was a United States Marine Corps Intelligence Officer, and author of Operations Plan 712: Advanced Base Operations in Micronesia, which became the basis for the American campaign of amphibious assault that defeated the Japanese in World War II. Ellis' prophetic study helped establish his reputation among the forefront of naval theorists and strategists of the era in amphibious warfare, foreseeing the eminent attack from Japan leading to the island-hopping campaigns in Central Pacific twenty years before the United States entered World War II. He is sometimes credited in being the 'first' recon Marine in the United States due to a secretive spy mission in the Pacific, reporting the build-up of Japanese naval forces.

=== Fleet Landing Exercises ===
During the Fleet Landing Exercises in the Caribbean in the late 1920s, Marines aboard the Navy vessels and submarines developed the joint-Navy/Marines' amphibious tactics. Most of the practiced beachhead landings amalgamated into what is known today as the Fleet Marine Force from the different types of units that became necessary for the Marine Corps to project itself to shore for the seizure of littoral areas of the world. Prior to the establishment of the United States Marine Corps' first division-sized organization, the Commander-in-Chief of the United States Fleet approved the training plan for the Fleet Marine Force in 1934 along the shores of Culebra, Vieques and Puerto Rico in a series of Fleet Landing Exercises, or FLEXs. Initially in the beginning of the exercises, the Marines and their equipment were transported by two US Navy battleships, the USS Arkansas (BB-33) and Wyoming (BB-32), and one Navy transport ship, the USS Antares (AG-10). They made their beach landings from fifty-foot whaleboats, climbing down cargo nets hung over the sides while biplanes provided smoke screens. A-frames were built to lower cargo and heavy equipment into the whaleboats, such as artillery pieces and tactical vehicles.

As each year, the FLEX has made improvements and modifications, the Fleet Marine Force Headquarters were moved to San Diego, California, in 1936. By 1938, submarines from Submarine Squadron 11 were used for practice in covertly disembarking small, recon landing teams of Marines onto the beaches, providing intelligence of their opposing team during the exercises. By movement under darkness of the night, they paddled their aircraft-type rubber boats, deflating them once on shore and re-inflating them to rendezvous back to the submarine at an appointed location. The Navy converted 'four-stacker' destroyer ships by removing two of the stacks and its boilers to provide spacious room for the Marines and their equipment. These modified ships were vintage old destroyers from the early 1920s, reclassified as high speed destroyer-transports, or APDs. By early World War II, the newer, faster and more modern class of destroyer escorts were substituted as an updated version class of APDs, which were later used extensively by the recon Marines and the Underwater Demolition Teams. Initially the recon teams paddled to shore until later, outboard motors were added. Plus, "Higgins Boats" and other modified landing crafts were introduced, towing the rubber crafts closer to shore.

Due to all the trial and error from the FLEXs, the 'Fleet Training Publication 167' was adopted as a proven doctrine for landing operations. Amphibious reconnaissance was expanded to include location of enemy defenses and their positions, its troops' strengths, weapons and obstacles. It also covered topography, hydrography and the ever-so important beach exits to permit the landing crafts to get off the beaches. Most of the material in the FTP 167 were also introduced and included in the 'Landing Force Manual':

"... directed effort by personnel landed from seaward by any means to collect the information on a coastal area required for the planning and conduct of amphibious operations... a landing conducted by minor elements, involving stealth rather than force of arms for the purpose of securing information, followed by a planned withdrawal."

== Organization ==
=== Amphibious Corps, Pacific Fleet ===
In December 1941, a joint-Army/Marine unit, the Observer Group, was formed as a specialized small-scale amphibious raiding party to conduct reconnaissance of the beachheads of Europe and North Africa, with Captain James Logan Jones as the commanding officer of the Observer Group. Jones's Group (Observer Group) was the first unit to be specifically trained as an amphibious reconnaissance asset in the United States military. By January 7, 1943, the Commanding General of Amphibious Corps, Major General Holland M. Smith disbanded the Observer Group and activated the Amphibious Reconnaissance Company, Expeditionary (Corps) Troops, Amphibious Corps, Pacific Fleet (ACPF), at Camp Elliott in California.

The new structure, however, still remained small as a company-size element as it consisted of a headquarters and service platoon and four reconnaissance platoons. Each of the recon platoons were commanded by a lieutenant and consisted of two six-man squads. These platoons were tailored with appropriate military attire and equipment for the amphibious patrol, which included light-weight armament, tennis shoes or other noiseless shoes, and no insignia worn on clothing. Other mission-essential equipment were knives, rope, and adhesive tape. The Table of Equipment (T/E) was only that which was essential and can be easily disposed. The total Company consisted of six officers and 92 enlisted Marines.

One of the training areas used by the Company included the northernmost section of Camp Pendleton, Tent Camp 3, an area which not only provided excellent terrain for training, but a messing facility as well. This illegally constructed mess hall had been erected by the previous ACPF's XO, Jimmy Roosevelt (the son of the late president Franklin D. Roosevelt). When discovered by the higher echelon later, it almost cost James Jones a court-martial until it was disclosed that Jimmy Roosevelt had built it and the charges were dropped.

For the next nine months the Company trained in the United States to perfect their new techniques as well as training and assisting in special duty with two United States Army units for amphibious reconnaissance missions, the Alaskan Scouts which was later cited for its performance in the campaigns of Attu and Kwajalein, and Alamo Scouts, which was employed at the landing of Kiska in the Aleutian Islands. For this purpose, the Company departed in July for special duty in Adak, Alaska, and Kiska, 01–23 August 1943, resuming regular duty back at Camp Elliott on 25 August 1943.

=== Fifth Amphibious Corps ===
By late 1943, so many Marines had poured into the Pacific campaign that on August 25, 1943, Rear Admiral Richmond K. Turner arrived in Pearl Harbor re-designated the "Amphibious Corps, Pacific Fleet," to the V [Fifth] Amphibious Corps, or VAC, with General Holland Smith acting as the Commanding General. Subsequently, the amphib recon Marines of "ACPF Amphib Recon Company" made their new organizational titular change to "Amphibious Reconnaissance Company, VAC", or dubbed VAC Amphib Recon Company. General Holland Smith, however, only assumed command of the VAC for only one month before being reassigned to Task Force 56 (Expeditionary Force / Troops) of the United States Fifth Fleet.

Thereafter, General Smith only acted as adviser to Jones's Amphib Recon Company, under authority of the Marine Commandant and Admiral Turner. The newly reorganized "VAC Amphib Recon Company" added one additional reconnaissance platoon (for a total of five) before being relocated to their new-wartime quarters from Camp Elliot, CA to Camp Catlin in Oʻahu, Hawaiʻi, to prepare for the invasion of the Gilbert Islands.

During Operation Galvanic the submarine USS Nautilus (SS-168) landed a force of 78 Marines of the amphib recon company to seize the island of Abemama on 21 November 1943. On the morning of 25 November, a native reported to the Marines that the remaining Japanese committed seppuku.

=== Fleet Marine Force, Pacific ===
Departing the Mariana Islands after the Battle of Tinian on August 9, 1944, VAC Amphib Recon Battalion returned to Hawaiʻi on August 20 and was redesignated as FMFPAC Amphib Recon Battalion, the Fifth Amphibious Corps (VAC) shifted its parent command under Fleet Marine Force, Pacific (FMFPac). The Amphibious Reconnaissance Battalion made its title change into the "Amphibious Reconnaissance Battalion, VAC, FMFPac" on August 26, 1944.

==== Company to battalion ====
After the events of the operation in the Gilberts and Marshall Islands, the VAC Amphibious Reconnaissance Company was infused with new replacements and took advantage of lessons learned in recent combat. On January 3, 1944, the Company reported their actual on-board personnel organization a strength of seven officers, 101 enlisted Marines, and two Navy Corpsmen; slightly over the intended strength due to the attached mortar section of 2nd Lt. Boyce L. Lassiter, and twenty-two of his enlisted mortarmen.

While Jones's Amphib Recon Company was the sole company involved in recon missions at the 'Amphibious Corps-level' [force-level], the staff of the V Amphibious Corps was aware of their limited availability due to their size of personnel, organization and equipment. Lt. General Holland Smith recommended to Marine Commandant A. A. Vandegrift that he expand the recon company to a battalion; thus allowing additional flexibility and continuity for assignment of missions. Less than a week after the return from the Marshalls, the Amphibious Reconnaissance Company, Amphibious Corp, Pacific Fleet (ACPF), was expanded and reorganized into VAC Amphibious Reconnaissance Battalion, ACPF, being activated in Hawaii April 14, 1944.

The two recon-company battalion Table of Organization (T/O) was approved and authorized on April 28, 1944, recommending the Battalion be commanded by a major, which promoted commanding officer James L. Jones Sr. from captain to the rank of major. In general, the battalion consisted of two companies, Company A (ALPHA) and B (BRAVO). The two companies comprised a weapons platoon made up a mix of twenty mortarmen and machine-gunners, and a headquarters company of six officers, forty-two EMs and thirteen Navy corpmen; making 303 men in all.

Lieutenant Merwyn Silverthorn remained as the company XO shortly until being replaced by a more senior Capt. Earl Marquardt. Silverthorn then assumed command of Alpha Company; 1st Lt. Russell Corey took command of Bravo Company. 1st Lt. Leo B. Shinn moved into the battalion's small headquarters. In June 1944, two staff non-commissioned officers were recommended for field promotion to second lieutenant and were acting as platoon leaders in lieu of the two officers' vacancy billets.

Additional communicators and radios increased the communications sections, plus additional mission-essential gear were scrutinized to obviate the prior necessity of "scrounging for gear" to get ready for their next operation. By June 30, the battalion was fully trained, equipped and in the field. The battalion headquarters detachment had a projected operational date of 15 July 1944.

Captain Jones was temporarily assigned duty in May 1944, with 1st Battalion 2nd Marines, 2nd Marine Division, aboard USS Stringham (DD-83) en route to Saipan where he participated in the action against the enemy 16–19 May 1944. After a brief return to Pearl Harbor, he returned to Saipan 16–30 June 1944.

== World War II-era ==
Three days after the attack of Pearl Harbor on December 7, 1941, the Japanese occupied the Gilbert Islands, and built a seaplane base on Makin that provided a token defense of Tarawa. They left a small number of Japanese Coastwatchers on Apamama, along with a few other atolls, to observe Allied forces in the South Pacific. It was after Carlson's Raiders that attacked Makin in August 1942 when the Japanese began to fortify and reinforce Tarawa, the largest and most strategically important atoll of the Gilberts. General Holland Smith mordantly blamed the Carlson raid for the rapid Japanese buildup and allegiantly felt, even after his retirement, that instead of subjecting heavy Marine casualties during the horrific and bloody seizure, Tarawa should have been avoided.

The joint amphibious force commander, Rear Admiral Richmond K. Turner, who was an effectual amphibious tactician, wrote a staunch dissertation over the mistakes during the Battle of Tarawa. Preeminent among the lessons scrutinized were that more and better aerial reconnaissance, more ships, landing crafts, amphibious tractors (or LVTs), and LCI Gunboats were needed. Three times the bombardment used at Tarawa in addition to increased pre-D-Day attacks by aircraft carriers, battleships, cruisers, and destroyers was extremely necessary. But above all, more use of submarine (periscope) reconnaissance was vital to pre-D-Day landings.

Aerial photography, submarine periscope photography and hydrographic reconnaissance by recon Marines and Navy UDT teams became part of the array of intelligence assets that were worked into the operation plan for the invasion. At the time, periscope photography was still new. Only a few ship captains had made single shots of sinkings, but Admiral Turner and General Smith were in need of more detailed and definitively located photographs of the beaches arranged in precise panoramic sequence. These would show enemy machine-gun and anti-boat gun emplacements as well as the locations of topographic features. Aerial photographs would be used in conjunction to provide a detailed photo interpretation.

The most significant employment of reconnaissance in World War II occurred at Tinian. Far more important than the reputations which hung in the balance among the very top planners, were the thousands of lives saved as a direct result of reconnaissance efforts.

Pre-D-Day reconnaissance was limited because of Vice Admiral Turner. He was cautious about acknowledging Saipan as the main initial target. Also, he had also declined all pre-D-Day amphibious reconnaissance at Tarawa, which in hindsight, led to the controversial topic of whether his lack of prepared pre-D-day amphibious reconnaissance contributed to the high casualty rate of Marines.

The seizure of the Ogasawara archipelago and the Volcano Islands were outlined in the OCTAGON Conference in September 1944 between U.S. President Franklin D. Roosevelt, British Prime Minister Winston Churchill and the Combined Joint Chiefs of Staff. Due to General Douglas MacArthur's landing on Leyte, it made modifications to the Combined JCS initial directive for General MacArthur to further seize Luzon on the targeted date of December 1944 and Admiral Chester Nimitz to provide cover and naval support by seizing the Bonin Islands, or the lesser Volcano Islands, on or about January 20, 1945 and Okinawa in the Ryukyu Islands on or about March 1, 1945. Both the islands of Formosa and Amoy were to be bypassed due to their physical size, close proximity to Japanese air strikes and the large, substantial numbers of the Japanese Marines that were heavily fortified in the area.

Admiral Nimitz chose Iwo Jima instead of ChiChi Jima for seizure, the largest islet in the Volcano Islands. He acknowledged that it would provide airfields for the P-51 Mustangs, to escort the B-29 Bombers for bombing Tokyo on mainland Japan, traveling 625 nautical miles (1,200 km) north from the newly acquired airbases on the islands of Saipan and Tinian. The operation of Iwo Jima, codenamed DETACHMENT, was given to Admiral Spruance and RAdm Hill by Admiral Nimitz. Iwo Jima was going to be the only major battle for 5th Marine Division, Task Force 56 (Expeditionary Troops) as a division-in-whole during World War II; however, half of the new 5th Division was formed by the enlisted Marines from prior engagements from other units.

Iwo Jima was the most heavily fortified island in the Japanese defenses, making it the bloodiest and costliest campaign in Marine Corps history. With news that the United States was delayed in the Iwo Jima operation, due to the support of Luzon and the campaigns in the Marianas, the Japanese took advantage of the opportunity in reinforcing their strength by attaching the 109th Infantry Division and adding heavier beach-defense weapons, artillery and tanks. Emperor Hirohito himself selected Lieutenant General Tadamichi Kuribayashi, a brilliant battle-hardened cavalry officer, as its commander.

The mission for Okinawa was given the codename ICEBERG. Operation ICEBERG was clarified when Admirals Ernest King and Chester Nimitz, Army's LtGen. Simon Buckner, commander of landing forces and LtGen. Millard "Miff" Harmom of the Army Air Corps met in San Francisco, CA, for finalization of the invasion plans. L-Day was set for April 1, 1945. The United States' Field Army, commanded by LtGen Buckner, divided it into two corps, the III Amphibious Corps consisting of 1st, 2nd and 6th Marine Divisions; and the Army's XXIV Corps consisting of the 7th, 77th and 96th Infantry Divisions.

Although the conflicts on Okinawa only lasted for three-plus months vice the five months for Guadalcanal, it proved to be one of the longest and most costly operations in the Central and South Pacific, involving six divisions and almost six times the naval shipping of Guadalcanal. The US Navy lost on average of one-and-a-half ships daily, also making it the costliest naval involvement in the history of sea warfare.

Night offensive action by the amphib recon Marines, not the normal practice during the earlier actions of World War II, was emphasized during the Okinawan campaign as the Marines conducted 21 night patrols and attacks, 13 of which were by the Amphibious Reconnaissance Battalion.

For its last actions on Okinawa, the FMF Amphib Recon Battalion returned to Pearl Harbor on September 12. Five days later, the battalion was disbanded and the bulk of its troops were sent to the replacement battalion at Pearl Harbor. The majority of them left for the United States aboard the LST 761.

=== The Gilbert Islands ===
On September 13, 1943, when Jones arrived to VAC in Hawaiʻi, he was handed further orders stamped CONFIDENTIAL to report to the large, mine-laying submarine USS Nautilus (SS-168) for temporary duty on September 15, 1943:

"Pursuant to authority which may not be quoted herein, you will stand detached from Marine Barracks, Camp Elliott... on September 10, 1943... reporting upon arrival to the Commanding General, Fifth Amphibious Corps, Pacific Fleet, for permanent duty beyond the seas."' —Orders from Rear Echelon to James L. Jones

Jones and Army Captain D. L. Newman reported to the commanding officer of the submarine USS Nautilus (SS-168), Commander William D. Irwin, on September 16, 1943, at the submarine base in Pearl Harbor during their Sixth War Patrol – under the orders of Rear Admiral Richmond K. Turner, who was commanding the amphibious assault, and wanted them to conduct periscope reconnaissance and produce panoramic photographs of all the beachheads of Tarawa, Kuma, Butaritari, Apamama and Makin. They became so proficient that the submarine's commanding officer purchased Submarine Combat Patrol insignias for Jones and Newman. They were not, however, presented, but retained by Commander, Submarine Squadron Four, Charles B. Momsen, since the policy of the Bureau of Naval Personnel was to award the insignia only to Navy personnel. William U. Irwin wrote to Captain Jones:

"It is regretted that this award cannot be made to you as it is felt that you gave of your fund of knowledge of the military aspects of the mission and participated in its successful completion."—Charles Momsen, letter to Chief of Naval Personnel

On October 16, 1943, USS Nautilus returned to Pearl Harbor after eighteen days of periscope photography and briefings were begun to prepare the company for their first mission in the Apamama Atoll (codename BOXCLOTH), becoming the first recon unit to perform amphibious reconnaissance in the Gilbert Islands. A message was received indicating probable Japanese troop buildup on Apamama. General Holland M. Smith conceived the concept of operations, reasoning that it would be best to land scouts on the main island of the Apamama Atoll by submarine to reconnoiter enemy positions before committing any sizable force.

Jones's VAC Amphibious Reconnaissance Company, along with three recon platoons, re-embarked USS Nautilus, except the 4th Platoon which had set out on a separate mission detached to the 27th Infantry Division for the raid on Makin Island. Several additional officers were attached to the company, including supernumeraries reporting to Jones, Lieutenant George Hand, an Australian from the Ocean Island Defense Force, as guide and interpreter. Lt. Hand had lived many years in the South Sea Islands and knew how to speak the native language, Gilbertese. Lieutenant E. F. Crosby, nicknamed "Bing", who was a Navy Civil Engineering Corps officer from the 95th Naval Construction Battalion assigned to make preparatory surveys, was to determine the location and suitability of an airfield. And Major Wilson Hunt from the 8th Base Defense Battalion was assigned to select gun positions on the atoll for the occupying force that was scheduled to come from Tarawa in a few days. Jones' Company departed Pearl Harbor, November 8, 1943, or D-Day 12, for Apamama.

By the next day, November 9, 1943, shakedown was completed and a shipboard routine prescribed for the troops and to the galley, as well as cleaning the compartments. Two troop lookouts supplemented the lookouts from the ship's company, enabling each Marine enlistedman and officer to be topside approximately once every 36 hours. However, due to the proximity of enemy air bases, the routine arrangement was discontinued on November 16. Also, it was necessary that personnel on the bridge be limited, should an emergency dive be required.

Each day while at sea, the entire crew of the Nautilus and the embarked Marines assembled onto the deck for briefings of their mission in the Gilbert Islands. The officers distributed small, scaled charts of the Central Pacific, and operational maps of Apamama were being discussed in detail with questions by the troops concerning the mission. A coding board was formed by the troop's officers to assist the ship's communications officer in decoding the rather heavy traffic received each night. A course in the Gilbertese language and customs of the natives was being instructed by Lt. George Hard. Although the Marines had some difficulty in learning the language, the instructions in customs later proved to have been of great value:

"... the advice given by Lt Hand as to the treatment of the natives, being carefully followed by the troops, resulted in not one case of friction developing between the troops and the natives during the six days the company was on the atoll." —Interview of James L. Jones, Commanding Officer, VAC AmphibRecon Co., 8 June 1975.

The Nautilus arrived onto Johnston Atoll on November 11, 1943, for emergency repairs. This gave a chance for the Marines to exercise for 45 minutes, which momentarily provided them some aid of comfort due to extensive time being in small, cramped submarine compartments.

They arrived at Tarawa on 18 – November 19. During a reconnaissance patrol, they discovered an eleven-degree compass error in the old British charts for the entrance into the Tarawa Atoll. Quickly, their Command Ship produced modified charts. This navigational correction, unbeknownst to the future task force in occupation of Tarawa, would serve crucial in their survival. While they were periscope reconnoitering Tarawa, Nautilus received an order for a rescue mission, to observe the waters for any downed naval aviators that were shot down during the bombardment of the island. As the Marines were monitoring the surf while the submarine crew was searching the waters for any pilots, a Japanese shore battery fired upon Nautilus and forced her to dive.

The submarine approached the island while remaining submerged and observed the island from less than 1,000 yards by periscope. A strong current made it impossible for the Nautilus to remain underwater and had to resurface, while the shore battery was still intact. No further incidents occurred with the shore battery, however, and by 1930, the strong current dissipated to allow Nautilus to re-submerge. Meanwhile, the rescue mission was canceled and Nautilus continued to proceed south to Apamama.

Commander Irwin was maneuvering on the ocean surface to avoid the reefs and ensure clearance, clearing the passage between Betio and the atolls to the south, until radar contact was made with an 'unidentified contact' approaching at 25 knots. He assumed it would not likely be any Japanese Naval forces; and since both his battery and air supply were low and the reef was shallow, Irwin decided not to submerge as precaution. As he readied his recognition signals, the 'contact' opened fire, which were the cruiser USS Santa Fe (CL-60) and destroyer USS Ringgold (DD-500), a nearby American naval task force, Task Force 53 led by Rear Admiral Harry W. Hill. They both picked up Nautilus on radar and due to low visibility, they feared it to be a Japanese patrol vessel and Hill gave orders to open fire. Unfortunately, the canceled recovery mission for the downed pilot hadn't been passed on to other ships in the vicinity, including Rear Admiral Hill's Southern Attack [Task] Force. Despite the precise marksmanship, the minatory projectile fortunately failed to explode.

Mixed reviews have been made on whether USS Santa Fe (CL-60) or USS Ringgold (DD-500) struck Nautilus. In the account of historian Samuel Eliot Morison, he claims that a five-inch shell from Ringgold struck Nautilus. According to the Marines on board the submarine, they clarified that it was a six-inch shell after examining it while they were back at Pearl Harbor. Thus it had to be from the main battery of the Santa Fe.

Nonetheless, water deluged down into the conning tower hatch, the gyroscope ceased to function, the main induction was flooded, and only immediate application of efficient damage control averted serious trouble. The submarine dove to 300 feet to make necessary repairs, although there was no place itself to hide from the averted dangers from the two ships' friendly fire. It didn't severely hinder the submarine; Nautilus continued southbound through the night en route to Apamama, the company's first combat reconnaissance mission. Apamama became perhaps the only atoll in history to be captured from a submarine.

==== Tarawa, November 1943 ====
On November 20, the D-Day for Tarawa (codename HELEN), First Lieutenant William D. Hawkins's 2nd Marine's Scout-Sniper Platoon, a recon-type unit, was the first to land at Betio of South Tarawa. In an assault scouting role, they secured the island. Other than the periscope photography made by Captains James Jones and D. L. Newman, there had been no prior amphibious reconnaissance landings on Tarawa. Although Jones's Amphibious Reconnaissance Company hadn't participated in the reconnaissance of the Tarawa Atolls, Jones's and Newman's photographs became paramount and made a success of the beach landings for the Marines in the assault on Tarawa. In addition, the adjacent atolls of Abaiang, Marakei and Maiana were landed on to inspect for fortifications, supplies or recent occupation.

==== Makin, November 1943 ====
The D-Day for atolls of Makin was the same day of Tarawa on November 20. 4th Platoon of VAC Amphibious Reconnaissance Company detached with 27th Infantry Division for the Makin Operation. First Lieutenant Harvey C. Weeks, a practicing attorney and Yale graduate from Kansas City (before the war), commanded the platoon. Being his first combat operation, his platoon was augmented with a rifle platoon and a machine-gun squad from the United States Army's 165th Infantry Regiment. The combined force occupied Kotabu, a reef-infringed islet guarding the entrance to Makin Atoll's lagoon. They landed unopposed and it later denied its use to the Japanese during the United States Army's assault of Makin Island. The 4th Platoon later assisted the 165th Infantry in the mop-up on Butaritari. By November 23, 1943, Makin was formally declared secure. Lt. Weeks arrived back to Pearl Harbor and joined up with the rest of Jones's company, which too had come back from a mission in the Apamamas.

==== Apamama, November 1943 ====
Operation Boxcloth, the reconnaissance beachhead landing on the Apamama Atolls, or Apamama was the first initial amphibious reconnaissance conducted by the Amphibious Reconnaissance Company. The Apamama recon and seizure of this atoll is considered the 'classic' example of a submarine recon, initially stealth, which evolved into a very successful reconnaissance-in-force.

In the late afternoon of November 20, 1943, the submarine USS Nautilus arrived off the coast of Apamama. Remaining submerged, the submarine circumnavigated the atoll examining the islands through the periscope, noting the entrance to the lagoon that was ringed by Entrance Island to the south and Abatiku on the north. Apamama Atoll was chosen for part of Operation Galvanic because of its large lagoon which could provide a base for logistic support to facilitate the western movement of the Pacific Fleet from Pearl Harbor. Codenames were given by the planners for the seizure of Apamama, each a word for the six islets. STEVE for main Apamama Island, forming the northern and most northeastern part of the atoll, and going clockwise; OSCAR, OTTO, ORSON, JOHN, and lastly JOE, which was adjacent to the mouth of the lagoon where Entrance Island is located. Their orders were to scout out the islands by using the cover of darkness; to determine the strength of the defending Japanese forces and select potential beaches for a planned landing for an occupying American force which was following in a few days. The unit was accompanied by Australian Army Lt George Hand formerly of the Ocean Island Defence Force acting as an interpreter.

They reached JOHN at approximately 1400 on November 20 and Jones and his officers had taken the opportunity to observe the preferred beach landing through the periscope. The plan was to have Jones's company to land onto JOHN at its southern tip of the atoll. Commander Irwin committed the submarine to remain submerged until 1930, and as the battery power was almost depleted from the day-long dive, it was necessary for her to run to the south while charging her batteries so that she would be able to dive if forced down by enemy action.

It became apparent that it was desired to hit the reef near half tide, and as high tide was at 2353, this made it necessary to choose the time of midnight to 0030, November 21, for disembarkation. Captain Jones, Lt. Hand and Lt. Crosby (the Navy CEC Engineers), and Major Hunt, along with rest of the company of sixty-eight Marines, ten Army bomb disposal combat engineers, minus Lt. Weeks's 4th Platoon (which was on a mission in the Makin Islands), inflated six ten-man sized rubber boats, or LCRLs, and loaded their equipment and wet-docked off the submarine.

Each man was handed three K-rations, one D-ration, and two fragmentation grenades. There were 45 rounds for each M1 carbine, 48 rounds for each M1 Garand rifle, 260 rounds for the M1918 Browning Automatic Rifle (or BAR), and 2000 rounds for each M1919 Browning machine gun as well as eight 511 SCR radio sets, two TBX-8 radio sets (that were similarly used by the Navajo Code Talkers), two blinder guns, six sets of semaphore flags and four 14" x 26" panels.

Only able to start four outboard motors out of the six, they cruised towards JOHN. About halfway, two more outboard motors had quit and the Marines ended up towing and paddling the others to shore. Running into squalls and fierce currents, two boats of Marines disappeared into the darkness while Marines on the others frantically paddled to avoid the razor sharp coral reef. The wind subsided about an hour later and the two missing boats joined the column as they rendezvoused 400 yards off the reef. At 0330 they landed; by then the men were already exhausted and torn up by the coral.

Prior to the main landing, 1st Lieutenant Leo B. Shinn, the Platoon Leader of 1st Platoon, proceeded with Lieutenant Harry C. Minnear, Platoon Leader of 2nd Platoon with eighteen men as an advance party toward the beach in two boats. Since the reef was too shallow for navigation, the boats halted, men fixed their bayonets, and Lieutenants Shinn and Minnear went ashore on a hasty reconnaissance to determine whether the beach was defended. After establishing a hasty semi-circular defense on the beach, one two-man patrol was dispatched to the right while Lt. Minnear remained in charge at the landing point and Lt. Shinn sent one man to the north to determine where they had landed. It was then apparent the current had diverted the Marines from their primary objective, JOHN, and had landed off the southwest corner of JOE instead.

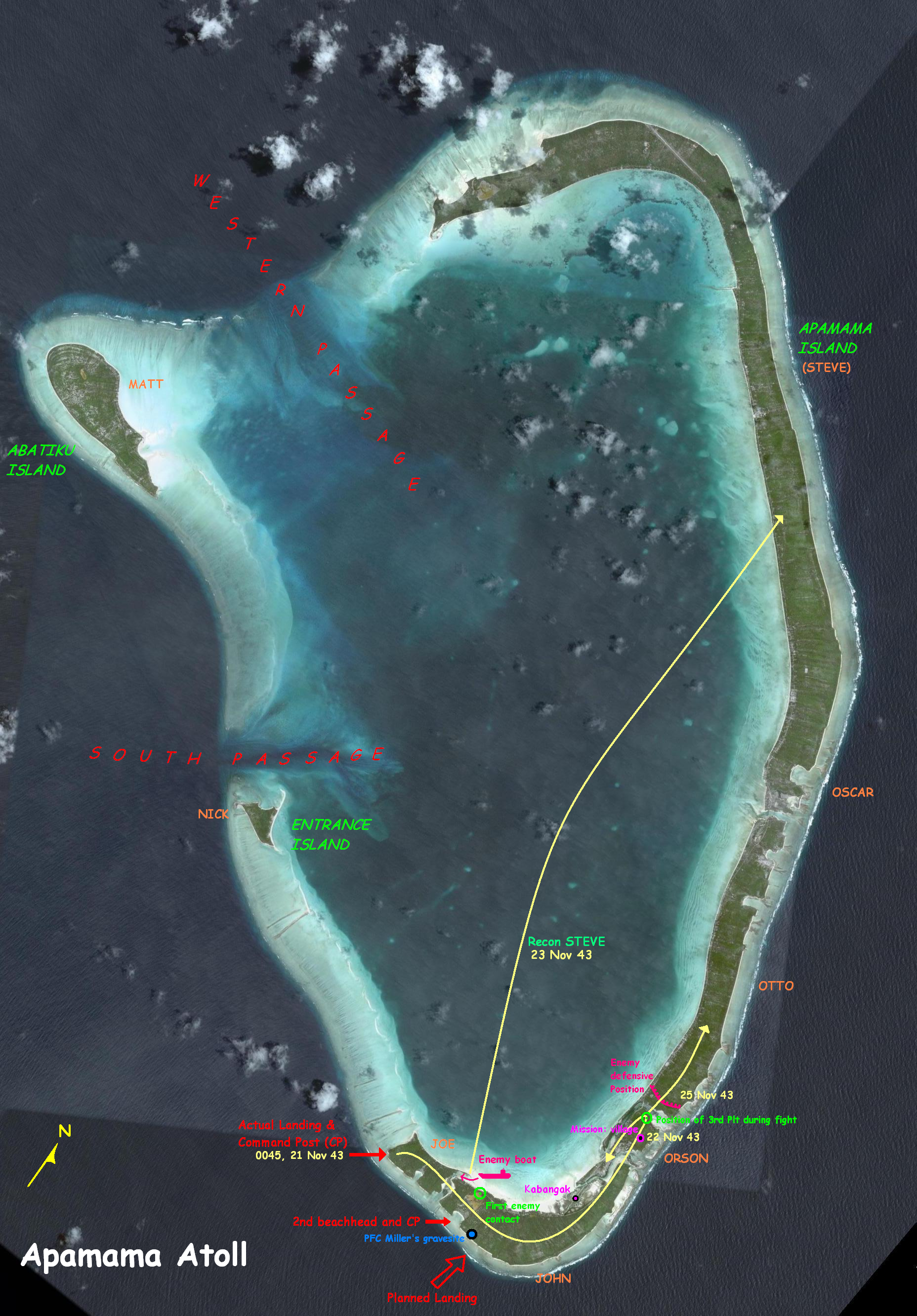
Recon of Apamama Atolls, VAC AmphibRecon Company, 11– 15 August 1942.

With no enemy in sight, at 0440, the remainder of the advance party was called in by runners and signals. 1st Lieutenant Merwyn H. Silverthorn, the company's Executive Officer, along with ten army engineers and a light machine gun section, established the beachhead and command post (CP). Machine guns were emplaced with interlocking fire, the squad of engineers established a semi-circular defense, fields of fire were cut, and hasty field fortifications were built. Boats and equipment were brought off the beach and reef and camouflaged.

While the beachhead was being secured and coded panels emplaced to communicate to the submarine, Captain Jones immediately sent three platoons out at 0530 as a reconnaissance-in-force around the west end of JOE Island. Lieutenant Corey went north to the lagoon shore with his 4th Platoon. Lt. Minnear took his 2nd Platoon west towards the western end of the small island.

Shinn's platoon went north and east towards reaching the northeast corner of the island at 0700. A camouflaged seagoing Japanese landing barge, diesel-powered and fully fueled was discovered moored in the channel between JOE and JOHN. Immediately after, Shinn's Marines spotted two Gilbertese natives crossing the channel from JOHN. Concealed and observing, they noticed two natives coming down a trail. Not knowing whether they were friendly, the recon Marines crouched and waited until they were practically on top of them.

Lt Hand (who was in Shinn's patrol) sprang up and greeted the natives in their own language. Using their best Oxford "missionary" English, the grinning natives replied,

"Why Mr. Hand. My word! I am glad to see you, but were you wise to visit us just now, Mr. Hand? The Sapanese are here!" [Gilbertese pronounced js like ss in English].

The two natives informed Hand that the Japanese were entrenched in force around a radio station on OTTO, one islet away. They described the Japanese defenses as being reinforced positions using coconut logs and reported that their weapons included two light machine guns, one heavy machine gun, rifles, bayonets, pistols and hand grenades. Also, there were twenty-five Japanese Marines, fewer than the number of the United States Marines, but were well dug in and "had plenty of ammunition". Three Japanese had been at the boat at 0600 that morning. They had radio equipment and were headquartered on OTTO Island. The Japanese were a coast-watching detachment left behind when the original Japanese occupying force of about 300 which had landed in September 1942, departed about a month later. The natives weren't reluctant in giving information as the Japanese had made extensive use of native labor with little or no compassion and had been generally oppressive toward them. Also, they also informed Lt. Hand that the Japanese knew they [Americans] were on the island and were in preparation.

They remained in the vicinity of the boat to keep it under surveillance; the patrol divided, the second and third platoons moving south along the reef passage to the southeast tip of JOE Island. Shinn returned to the CP and reported his findings. Jones dispatched 1st Lt. Russell Corey's 3rd Platoon at noon to put the Japanese barge out of commission without permanently disabling it by removing the spark plugs from the engine and made accelerator adjustments. The barge was the only means for the Japanese to escape to the north. The Marines moved out along the road to the boat in a staggered squad column with point and flankers. About two hundred yards away, a Japanese patrol of three men were encountered who were already at the barge. Under fire, Corey's BAR man, Pvt Homer J. Powers, killed one with an offhand shot while the other two escaped into a nearby grove.

Back at the command post (CP), a new word came in from the natives that the Japanese had gathered all their weapons and were moving rapidly to the barge site. At 1300, Captain Jones with all available Marines, First and Second Platoons, moved out to join Lt. Corey and the light machine gun section (who had just put the boat out of commission) at the road junction just west of Kabangak Village, to interdict the Japanese at the barge. Corey's 3rd Platoon joined Jones with the 1st and 2nd Platoons at 1400.

The Japanese obviously passed through Kabangak village on JOHN, learned of Jones's presence, turned around and returned to OTTO to reoccupy their prepared defensive positions. Captain Jones began a reconnaissance-in-force, moving across ORSON, the island just south of OTTO, occupied by the Japanese. While en route contact was made with large numbers of natives leaving their villages for the groves. A Catholic Mission was reached by 1550 and the five white missionaries, three French Roman Catholic priests and two Australian nuns, verified the natives' information concerning the Japanese positions and strength.

The Apamama natives informed Jones of a sandspit at the tip of OTTO opposite the mission, running northwest from ORSON, from which the Marines would be able to observe the lagoon (western) flank of the Japanese defenders, and to avoid crossing the bridge that connected the two islands, OTTO and ORSON.

As Jones moved his entire company of Marines across the reef to the tip of the sandspit on ORSON, Japanese rose from higher terrain to the north of the advancing Marines and opened fire with light machine guns. One Marine killed one of the defenders at one hundred yards. When the lead elements of the company had advanced 250 yards up the sandspit, the company came under a barrage of fire from a nest of light machine guns emplaced from their eastern (right) flank, the coconut log positions on the south end of OTTO. The Marines found themselves in an unfavorable position for an attack and could not locate the position of the machine gun, while under fire with only one hour of daylight left and facing a rising tide, which was due to come in another hour. It would force the Marines to remain on the sand spit all night from where it would have been impossible to contact the submarine. Jones broke off contact and withdrew his company to the northern beach of ORSON.

While en route back to their beachhead, Jones paused in Kabangak village and questioned the Catholic Mission. By midnight, his Marines were exhausted; they had not slept for 48 hours and were in a state of extreme fatigue, especially having endured the events aboard the Nautilus prior to the landing, the heavy surf, and the reconnaissance through very heavy brush. Furthermore, they made several attempts to communicate with the Nautilus but to no avail since it had submerged earlier after making a radar contact with a Japanese submarine 3500 yards away; the Marines were unable to communicate results of the first day of their reconnaissance. They decided to rest and set up defensive positions and bought additional supplies from the natives. Also, they had learned that one of the Gilbertese natives was a pilot and obliged to guide arriving troops on JOHN or through the lagoon, but only once they were able to contact Nautilus, until then, they waited while under vigilance for any unsuspecting Japanese forces. At 0300, the Marines spotted lights out at sea and disappeared, believing it to be a Japanese submarine trying to contact the Japanese defenders, but with no attempt to evacuate them from the atoll.

By the next morning on November 22, 1943, the Marines had control of JOE and JOHN and were able to prevent the Japanese from escaping from the atoll. Lieutenants Hand and Crosby and Major Hunt made their own recon to the south end of ORSON and located an abandoned Japanese truck. This permitted them to rapidly reinforce anywhere along OTTO's beaches. Their rubber boats were heavily damaged in crossing the coral reef from their initial landing a few days back; they were in no shape to be used to envelop their movement by sea to out-flank the Japanese machine gun defense.

Gunnery Sergeant Charles Patrick took a small patrol up the seaward side of ORSON to see if they could flank the Japanese from the other side, but in the process, one of his Marines came under fire and was wounded. The Japanese had powerful 31" glasses and could observe all movement and also had accessible motor transport, enabling them to move along to any point on ORSON or STEVE, making a landing behind their position by rubber boats not advisable. This determined that crossing the channel between ORSON and OTTO, they would suffer a great number of casualties. They decided that additional firepower would suffice as it would be required to move troops across the open reef.

By 0700, the 1st and 3rd Platoons furnished camp security and cleaned weapons. Jones then gave the 1st and 3rd Platoon a mission to investigate the Japanese barge to determine whether it had been tampered by the enemy since they last were there; and also to reconnoiter-in-force along the road to the vicinity of the mission and the area across the reef passage from the main Japanese defenses. Meantime, the 2nd Platoon transported all the company's equipment and supplies from their old to their new beachhead, completing their movement at 1245.

The 3rd Platoon led off at 1330 to complete Jones's objectives but was terminated to join the 1st Platoon as they moved in to establish a defense. A squad was dispatched to investigate the Japanese boat and returned at 1430 to report that all was secure. The Marines believed they had been spotting a ship off from NICK, presuming it to be Japanese. The 2nd Platoon and the Machine Gun section were prepared for a bombardment and to repel any enemy landing. It was later identified as a United States salvage tug.

Also in the excitement, Lieutenants Corey and Shinn marched to the lagoon and surveyed the horizon with binoculars and spotted several objects which appeared and resembled ships. Due to the changing conditions of the visibility of atmospheric changes, they seemed to disappear and reappear. Corey and Shinn radioed the information to Captain Jones. Jones and his Marines standing by were convinced; after careful and lengthy observance, a native was called over and interrogated and it was learned that the objects were a beacon and several lone palm trees on the islets on the opposite side of the lagoon.

At 2030, Captain Jones finally made radio contact with Nautilus and conferred with Commander William D. Irwin, the ship's captain, providing him with the results of the day's reconnaissance; requesting him to relay the situation with the arrangement of new supplies so the reconnaissance force could remain ashore 15 more days. Together they devised a plan of shell bombardment with the submarine's six-inch guns on the enemy position the next day.

They were able to ferry fifteen days' worth of provisions and ammunition to the beach, brought in by using the ship's motor whale boat and four LCR-Ls. The landing of supplies was completed by midnight. Between 0100 and 0900, on several occasions, blinker lights were observed at sea, assumed to be from the Japanese submarine endeavoring to contact their garrison force ashore.

On November 23, the third day since the initial reconnaissance landing, the 1st and 3rd Platoons reconnoitered JOHN and STEVE from 0700 to 1615. The Marines enjoyed their first hot meal at noon as stew made from dehydrated carrots, potatoes, onions, and roast beef. Once the two platoons returned from recon patrol, Jones and his entire company marched forward to the channel between the islands 150 yards from the Japanese fortifications. 1st Lieutenant Silverthorn and four Marine from 2nd Platoon took Major Hunt and Lieutenant Crosby with ten Army engineers and made a hasty beach reconnaissance, to reestablish a beachhead on the south side of the channel. Crosby made a soil test and examined the coral mud on the lagoon-side of the island, checking soil permeability for a feasible airstrip. The recon Marines emplaced machine guns in the center of their line and at 0800, they laid a base of fire onto the Japanese positions. They radioed Nautilus and request naval gunfire support from their six-inch deck gun. Jones returned to his Marines and issued the orders for the attack.

Prior to their disembarkation, Nautilus and the recon Marines developed a coded display system in the event of radio communication problems by using four twelve-by-sixteen-foot navy mattress covers to double as signal panels. One configuration would indicate "situation in hand," while others would advise specific needs, i.e., "ammo", "water", and other necessities. Usually front lines were marked by colored air panels or painted oars. But on Apamama, the four mattress covers were significantly used as banners and later provided the Marines' current line positions to the submarine.

Relying on the navy mattress covers that the Marines had hung in the palm trees to use for signaling, Nautilus fired a barrage of seventy-five rounds with super-quick fuses from four thousand yards at sea. These rounds would burst from the air as they would hit the palm fronds at the top of the coconut palms. This proved effective for the Japanese that were in the open but not for any Japanese seeking shelter in their coconut log bunkers.

The crew on Nautilus discovered that one of their six-inch guns was malfunctioning in the elevating mechanism and would slip, causing the shell to over-shoot great distances from their intended target. On their own initiative, they commenced a check-fire on that gun. However, Corey radioed to the submarine requesting a full check-fire as the rounds were falling very close to his lines. Since the naval gunfire had not appeared to have an effect on the heavy Japanese fire, Captain Jones ordered a cease-fire. Jones requested by radio to Nautilus, that it was decided that a supply of mortars would be the obvious solution to tamper the effects of the Japanese machine gun emplacements.

Nonetheless, heavy machine gun fire prolonged mostly throughout their third day. As long as the men would lay prone, most of the rounds would go over their heads. Heavy enemy machine gun fire pinned down the crew of Lt Corey's Machine Gun section and it was impossible to move gun or crew. Pvt Carroll E. Berry and Pvt James E. Hensley of the crew had their canteens and hip pockets torn by the enemy fire. One of the recon BAR Marines, PFC William D. Miller, was hit by two machine gun bullets while in an exposed position. In an audacious effort under intense fire, Private Bert B. Zumberge attempted to rescue him. While attempting to render first aid and tried to shield PFC Miller with his own body from the enemy machine gun fire, Zumberge was also hit. Twice in the upper left arm, between shoulder and elbow, one bullet fracturing his arm. He continued to render first aid as Sgt Samuel F. Lanford helped Zumberge to cover after much protesting from Zumberge that Miller first be moved. But Miller was badly hit and could not easily be moved. Sgt Lanford returned to remove PFC Miller; enemy fire became increasingly heavy. PFC Miller was hit twice more and it became impossible to get to him, and two of the company's Corpsmen James E. Fields and Morris C. Fell exposed themselves several times trying to retrieve Miller.

PFC Harry J. Marek was wounded by an accidental discharge of a BAR in their established beachhead area, taking a round in the chest. Corporal John F. King had developed a severe hernia while unloading supplies the previous night. Jones made contact with the Nautilus at 2000 and evacuated PFC Marek and Cpl John F. King through the surf by rubber boat. Marek later died and was buried at sea.

By noon, while Jones was awaiting the arrival of his requested mortars, Nautilus radioed to him that the American transports were at the WEST PASSAGE and suggested that Jones meet them in the whaleboat. Jones broke off the firefight and consolidated his positions. He decided to coordinate with the approaching naval Task Force that arrived as the island occupation force. He sent Lt. Shinn with the 2nd Platoon back to the 3rd Platoon with orders to assist their withdrawal.

Captain Jones had taken a small group with him, Major Hunt, Lt. Crosby, Lt. Hand, George, the native pilot, and Sgt Daniel J. Bento and started across the lagoon in the whaleboat for the Task Force at the WEST PASSAGE, a three-hour boat trip. They saw a number of transports, two hospital ships and numerous escorting men-of-war ships. As they were about one-half hour, all the ships of the task force left the area. About 1 nautical mile (2 km) from the Task Force, Hunt spotted the 'feather' of a submerged periscope 700 yards (600 m) from their position. The submarine made no moves toward the small party, so they returned to the atoll. No physical contact was made with the approaching task force.

Meanwhile, Shinn arrived at 1245 and informed Lt. Corey that the 1st and 2nd Platoons were pulling back, returning to the beachhead. Corey's machine-gunners were receiving heavy fire, however, making it impossible to extricate them, and the Lieutenant decided to pull them out. Shinn departed, leaving one squad with Corey and taking Pvt Zumberge along.

While Jones and his small group had moved to the WEST PASSAGE to contact the task force, a US Navy destroyer USS Gansevoort (DD-608) appeared on the other side of the atoll. Lt Silverthorn went out to DD-608 and gave her captain a description of the situation which in return sent a small landing party to offer them naval gunfire support agreeing to shell the enemy Japanese positions. By this time, Jones and his small group returned. Corey radioed Captain Jones at 1315 that he was not pulling out until he could move his machine-gunners and wounded, and would remain until dark if necessary. At 1330 he dispatched a patrol under Sgt Lanford went to see if it were possible to pull out the machine gun and PFC Miller. The enemy fire had slackened considerably. Sgt Lanford returned with the Machine Gun crew and PFC Miller, who unfortunately had died as a result of his wounds.

Pvt Zumberge was evacuated to USS Gansevoort by Lt. Silverthorn's rear CP along with Pvt Dannie O. Messenger who had been shot while returning to the CP from an outpost at 0500. Lt. Corey's group reached camp by 1700. The destroyer moved out to fire on the enemy positions between 1800 and 1900 and fired many rounds of five-inch shells into the enemy position. Jones had the destroyer fire some fifty rounds. The fire hit the coconut palms causing air burst (exactly Nautilus's firing routine earlier) except that this time it proved quite effective and agreed to continue its use the following morning on the Japanese positions.

PFC Miller was buried early in the morning of November 25, 1943, at the site of the second beachhead CP. Most of the day was spent clearing fields of fire and building field fortifications since at 0730, natives had arrived informing Jones that some of the Japanese were dead and they had left their positions, leaving behind two wounded. Captain Jones dispatched Lt Shinn's First Platoon to guard the Japanese boat and whaleboat, and anticipating that the enemy would make an attempt to attack the beachhead or break through to their boats, strengthened the beachhead defenses. Lt Shinn's men altered the whaleboat to render it temporarily useless.

At 1400, an English-speaking Apamamese boy puffing a cigarette that Lt. Hand had given him appeared, shouting "The Saps are all dead." He had secluded himself near the Japanese radio station and observed the remaining Japanese that survived the Navy/Marine gunfire. The garrison commander, a Japanese Captain, assembled his troops in two ranks and was giving them an oration to motivate his troops. The Japanese captain brandished a samurai sword in one hand and waved a pistol in the other, urging them to "Kill all Americans!" During his violent gesturing the pistol accidentally discharged, shooting himself in the stomach, killing him. Completely demoralized, the Japanese troops began digging their own graves; when they were done, they lay down in them and shot themselves in their jaws, committing mass suicide.

Captain Jones dispatched his executive officer, Lt. Silverthorn and Lt. Corey with two platoons to investigate. When they arrived at the Japanese CP at 1700, they confirmed the death of the twenty-three dead Japanese defenders in all. It was difficult for them to understand why they committed suicide; near each individual firing position were several hundred rounds of ammunition, and from ten to forty hand grenades. Also lying about were approximately a dozen rifles, ten pistols, two light machine guns, and one heavy machine gun. An examination of the position revealed that the Japanese had fire superiority despite their inferior numbers. The area included the radio station, officers' quarters, QM shed, boat shed, numerous huts, and live chickens. No articles were touched and all men were cautioned about touching any of the many wires. The Marines began to bury the dead with help from the Apamamans.

At 0700 on November 26, 1943, the Marines sighted the USS Maryland (BB-46), USS Harris (APA-2), and escorting ships closing in on the beachhead. While Jones was launching a boat, a plane dropped a message inquiring whether it were safe to land troops. Jones replied affirmative and continued out to USS Harris to contact Lieutenant Colonel McLeod, Commanding Officer of 3rd Battalion, 6th Marines. India Company was dispatched and landed without incident. An officer from USS Maryland arrived with an order from division ordering Jones' Marines to embark USS Harris at once. Camp broke at 1030 and all expendable gear turned over to Captain North, Commanding Officer of India Company as the Recon Marines departed Apamama and the natives that had helped them so well.

The Marine recon losses on the Apamama operation were two killed, two wounded, and one injured. Brigadier General Leo D. Hermle, Assistant Division Commander of the 2nd Marine Division landed with the 3rd Battalion, 6th Marines and assumed occupation duties. An eight-thousand-foot airstrip was carved out of Apamama's coral by the Task Force's Naval Construction Battalion of Naval Base Abemama. By January 15, 1944, this airstrip was being used by heavy bombers to the Marshall Islands for continuation of the attack. Captain Jones was later awarded the Legion of Merit by Lieutenant General Holland M. Smith for this impeccable amphibious reconnaissance operation.

=== The Marshall Islands ===
Planning in the Gilbert Islands was successful but highly costly during Operation GALVANIC. In December 1943, a modified plan was made to neutralize the inessential islands in the Marshall Islands, the atolls of Jaluit, Wotje, Maloelap, and Mili. There was also the need to seize Kwajalein, the main Japanese naval base in the Marshalls.

The Joint Chiefs of Staff gave approval; D-Day was changed to January 31, 1943, resulting from Fleet Admiral Chester Nimitz and Admiral Raymond Spruance acquiescing to Turner's recommendations. The operation was given the codename FLINTOCK, permitting the assembly of sufficient combat shipping to accommodate two divisions, and all participating ships, aircraft and ground elements increased preparations.

Following their successful seizure of the Apamama Atoll with the conjunction of the Tarawa operation in November 1943, VAC Amphibious Reconnaissance Company returned to Pearl Harbor for training, weapons upgrading and replacement of the two Marines killed; preparing for their next objectives, reconnoitering the atolls in the Marshalls. LtGen Holland Smith, the VAC Commander, was convinced that Jones's company could repeat the same success seizing Majuro and Eniwetok as they had in the Apamamas.

The Majuro Atoll (also known as 'Arrowsmith' Atoll) lies 256 miles (410 km) southeast of Kwajalein, consisting of fifty-six islets that were adequate for long airstrips along the lagoon that is 21 miles (34 km) long and up to 8 miles (13 km) wide, with a total of 90 square miles (230 km^{2}) of lagoon area highly suitable for a fleet anchorage. The islands are ringed by an enclosing reef on the seaward side of the islets.

First Lieutenant Harvey C. Weeks of the 4th Platoon and his reinforced platoon of forty-two men landing on Calalin Island in the Majuro Atoll, were the first Americans to land on territory that was held by the Japanese prior their attack Pearl Harbor; since many islands were occupied thereafter by the Japanese. This honor, however, was given in error to the Army Scouts of the 7th Infantry Division for their landing on Kwajalein five hours later. Since the Army Scouts were trained by the VAC Amphibious Reconnaissance personnel, it didn't tarnish any mixed feelings, and they shared their honor. The 7th Scouts were subsequently commended the Presidential Unit Citation.

==== Majuro, January–February 1944 ====
Majuro was one out of four attack groups operating in the landing beachhead assault during the greater Operation FLINTOCK. Admiral Spruance initiated the operation in the Majuro to secure additional air and sea bases as it possessed the largest potential fleet anchorage in the Central Pacific.

The Majuro Atoll consists of fifty-six islets along a lagoon that is 21 miles (34 km) long and up to 8 miles (13 km) wide ringed by a reef on the seaward side of the islands. The main island of Majuro was long, thin and enclosed on the southern side of the lagoon. Over fifty-six codenames were used on the islands that made up the Majuro Atoll, or codename SUNDANCE. Captain Jones's company was involved in the pre-planned reconnaissance. They landed only on the northern islets of Calalin (LUELLA) and Eroj (LUCILLE), considered entrance islands to the lagoon; Uliga (ROSALIE) and Delap (SALOME), the western portions of the atoll; the main island of Majuro (LAURA), running 10 miles (16 km) west-to-east along the southern end of the atoll; and Djarrit (RITA).

On January 21, 1944, VAC Amphibious Reconnaissance Company, with the addition of 1st Lt. Harvey C. Weeks's 4th Platoon (which returned from a mission in the Makin Atoll), embarked on USS Kane at the destroyer escort docks in Pearl Harbor for amphibious reconnoitering of the Majuro Atoll. Attached to the company was Lt. George Hard, Ocean Island Defense Force, as guide and interpreter (who was present during the Apamama operation previously); Mr. William Mueller of the Gilbert Islands, also as interpreter; and Staff Sergeant Schlosenberg and Technical Sergeant Szarka from Corps Public Relations.

USS Kane, along with VAC, departed Pearl Harbor on January 23, 1944, and rendezvoused with Task Force 51, or the Majuro Attack Group, on January 24. As soon as the ship cleared the channel, the ship's captain gave a briefing of the predetermined mission en route to Majuro over the public address system and cartographs were distributed among the officers and Marines. A preliminary discussion of the mission and detailed plans were given of the approaching operation and familiarization of the topography of Majuro (SUNDANCE). Kane remained with the convoy until 2200 on January 29, 1944, to proceed alone to SUNDANCE arriving on January 30, 1944.

Kane harbored at a point thought to be 5000 yards seaward from LUELLA Passage, at 2030, nine hours prior to the main attack force. Before an advanced landing party was about to set off to shore, they discovered that an error had occurred in navigation, due to misinterpretation of the island profile. The group reembarked Kane and proceeded northward approximately 12,000 yards to their corrected position toward LUELLA.

Arriving at their planned location at 2130, Jones dispatched Weeks's and his nineteen Marines of the 4th Platoon, reinforced by eleven mortarmen from a Mortar Platoon commanded by 2nd Lieutenant Boyce L. Lassiter. The lesson was learned that having attached mortarmen was paramount, after their experience during the previous Apamama Operation, codename BOXCLOTH. There were eight headquarters personnel with one Corpsman and interpreter. Each recon Marine carried one-third of a K-ration and D-Ration, two fragmentation grenades and 45 rounds of .30 Carbine ammunition for their M1 carbines (or) 48 rounds of .30-06 ammunition for the M1 Garand rifles (or) 280 rounds of.30-06 per Browning Automatic Rifle, determining who was assigned to which weapon.

Weeks and his Marines of the 4th Platoon disembarked from Kane; twenty men and two officers loaded onto one Higgins landing craft while the remaining ten loaded onto two rubber boats, which were towed in line astern to the Higgins boat. During the first 2000 yards, due to heavy seas, the towing rings were pulled out of both rubber boats and the Marines attempted to maintain the movement by grasping the towline and bracing their feet against the rubber cross pieces.

Two Sergeants, James B. Rogers and Blackie Allard, were pulled into the sea with full combat gear with un-inflated life preservers. After Allard was retrieved, Cpl Cecil W. Swinnea, a Texan, inflated his own life preserver and tossed it as a lariat to Rogers who was retrieved several minutes later. All the men were subsequently transferred to the Higgins boat, which barely floated with the additional weight. Despite the fact that several Marines fell overboard, at 0400, the main landing party landed on LUELLA with all their men safe and no adherent loss to their troops.

By midnight, at 2330 on January 30, Weeks's recon team landed on the beachhead, and immediately he sent Lassiter and sixteen men to reconnoiter the adjacent islet of LUCILLE. Embarking on a rubber craft, they trekked across the separating passage. It was extremely difficult because of shallow reefs and poor visibility. Splitting into five patrols of three men each, Lassiter's team landed on LUCILLE at 0230. Meanwhile, at 0030, Weeks continued to reconnoiter the remaining island of LUELLA.

While Lassiter faced no findings of any enemy contact nor presence on LUCILLE, they returned to Lt. Weeks's party and they rendezvoused back with USS Kane informing Captain Jones their retrieved information. By 0200 on January 31, 1944, Kane and the rest of VAC Amphib Recon Company reached their position approximately 3000 yards southeast tip of ROSALIE to coordinate a small landing on SALOME for reconnoitering.

An advanced landing team, led by Silverthorn, scouted first to cover the landing and set up a command post while signaling to the main landing craft remaining adrift from Kane, using hooded flashlights—two long dashes separated by two-minute pauses. As the remainder of the VAC Amphib Recon Company was trekking to shore, four rubber crafts capsized, losing some of their equipment. A Marine photographer lost most of his camera equipment, and they had to ditch two rubber crafts for the sake of riding in the Higgins boat.

Rear Admiral Harry W. Hill from the Majuro Attack Group scheduled to commence bombardment at 0600 on January 31 from aerial and naval gunfire from the cruiser USS Portland (CA-33) and USS Bullard (DD-660), a destroyer, after the team's SRC-620 field radio had maintained radio silence. For eighteen minutes, the Marines and natives on SALOME were bombarded by friendly-fire until finally at 0630 the message got through by Jones using a TBX radio. No Marines nor natives, nor especially the major Japanese buildings were hit.

Most of the projectiles hit the coconut trees and were air bursts. Jones concluded that there were no Japanese other than the four patrols of recon Marines already on the ground. Fifteen minutes later, Jones received word that the gunfire would cease and to move the patrols out of the area immediately.

Captain Jones meanwhile had been ordered to rendezvous with the CO of BLT 2/106 on board USS Cambria (APA-36) to discuss further amphibious reconnaissance on RITA and LAURA. Reembarking USS Kane, Capt. Jones dispatched Shinn's Platoon and Minnear's platoon. When the 1st Platoon and 2nd Platoon were proceeding across the reef passage to RITA, the 2nd Platoon was spotted by an observation plane from the USS Portland. Assuming that the Marines were enemy Japanese troops, the pilot proceeded to strafe the platoon. Despite the signals from the Marines, the pilot maintained strafing maneuvers; no one was injured and the men sustained minor injuries from the obstacles of the coral reefs.

Shinn's platoon located a village on RITA and reported no enemy with no natives present; twenty or more excellent temporary frame buildings in good condition, none of which had been damaged by the "friendly" naval gunfire. Laid scattered in the area were numerous items, such as hand carts, steel rails, lumber, window frames, empty oil drums, a small steam locomotive and a narrow gauge railway line, a heavy steam roller, explosive materials, insulated electrical wire, and abundance of coconuts and papaya.

By interrogating the natives, they revealed that there were an Imperial Japanese Navy Warrant Officer, Japanese garrisons and a few civilians working on LAURA. Two natives agreed to accompany Jones's company as guides and interpreters, Eliu and Jeff Jefferson, a trader native to the Marshall Islands. They both agreed to accompany the Marines as an interpreter and guide for the islet of LAURA. Shinn's and Minnear's platoons continued to reconnoiter until 0800, when they reembarked USS Kane, reporting back to Jones that RITA was secured.

On February 1, 1944, Capt. James Jones had received orders to assemble his company on Kane by 1700 to prepare for a reconnaissance of LAURA, disembarking by 2100, January 31 and Arno Atoll later that night. He secretly emplaced three patrols about the headquarters and a fourth patrol set to watch the two other Japanese houses.

Harbored 4000 yards off the eastern point of LAURA Island, Weeks and his 4th Platoon, reinforced with twenty Marines from Lassiter's mortar platoon, landed on LAURA at 0030 using two Higgins boats. Eliu, the interpreter accompanying Weeks, began questioning the local natives. By 2300, Eliu encountered two of her native acquaintances and had agreed to lead their patrol to three houses occupied by the Japanese in a nearby settlement. Reaching the main native settlement at 0100, they immediately began making their reconnaissance working north. All natives were not permitted to travel to the village; they were instructed instead to stay away from the village, passing it on to every native citizen along the way.

The presence of the patrols became quickly noticeable to the many natives in the vicinity, who became too numerous to control silently. And their solution was, that it became necessary to rush the houses. Doing so, twelve or fourteen people, including children, would flee from the front porch into the heavy foliage. Two patrols attempted a pursuit but were able to apprehend only two natives. Two other patrols proceeded to investigate the other Japanese fales but were found deserted.

They reached the Japanese garrison and began to search the area and the beach fales. They recovered crude grenades made from 100 lbs of dynamite, one.30-cal machine gun, one 7.07 mm machine gun and two.50-cal machine guns with plenty of ammunition, which came from a downed B-24 Liberator. When the Japanese abandoned Majuro in November, 1942, they left many finished or nearly completed buildings and barracks, an observation tower, seaplane hangars and good construction equipment and materiel. Nothing could be learned as to the whereabouts of the Japanese naval officer.

At about 0530, the Japanese Imperial Navy Warrant Officer Nagata crept back to his quarters. Although armed with a katana and an American-issued.45-cal pistol, Lt. Weeks, a former college wrestler, jumped him from the rear, taking him down. He had formerly been in charge of the 400 laborers building gun emplacements on various Marshall Atolls, but at present was stationed as an overseer to the Japanese property and buildings on RITA Island.

As Nagata put up no resistance, Lt Weeks' detail returned to the original beachhead at 0600 with all available personnel to LAURA Village. Later, Lt. Corey's 4th Platoon captured three more Japanese on LAURA and held them as prisoners. In one of the fales, they found additional gear from the crashed B-24; fire-damaged flight suits, flight jackets, a.30-cal machine gun, a sextant and a khaki shirt with the name "Master Tech Sergeant Hanson" on the collar. Natives later confirmed that those two machine guns and gear were salvaged from a B-24 that was ditched a month ago. The American crew were taken prisoner and evacuated to the Maloelap Atoll.

At 0955, on the morning of D-Day January 31, 1944, Rear Admiral Hill was able to report to Vice Admiral Spruance that Majuro was then secured and the Marines awaited the return of the LCP(R) to take Jones's company to the command ship USS Cambria and Jones conferred with the officers of BLT 2/206. Majuro Atoll was secured at 1500 on January 31, 1944, with Jones and his recon Marines having accomplished their mission of securing the Entrance Islands to safeguard the passage of the transport.

An Army battalion was sent the following morning and Task Force 51 circled the atoll and anchored in the lagoon. Jones received further orders to reembark Kane at 1500 and the Marines reembarked with their prisoner under guard of Platoon Sergeant French LeClair with all Japanese weapons found on LAURA Island. By 1630, Jones and his company proceeded to officially secure SALOME and ROSALIE on the east end of the lagoon.

Jones was ordered to report to the Commanding General, V Amphibious Corps to reconnoiter Arno Atoll (CARILLON). After landing and finding nothing to report, they reembarked USS Kane.

The next evening on D+1 (Day-Day plus 1), February 2, USS Washington (BB-56) and USS Indiana (BB-58) arrived and joined the rest of the ships in anchor. By next day of February 3, over thirty ships were harbored in the lagoon.

The Company departed and embarked USS Kane at 0700, February 3, 1944, ascertaining that there were no Japanese in the atoll. The captured warrant officer provided valuable information. Captain Jones recommended that the interpreters who accompanied the patrol be furnished in debt to the VAC. Jeffries was received aboard the flagship with appropriate honors. Also, Jones saved valuable installations from destruction from naval gunfire and aerial bombardment. One of the larger buildings on the island was converted into a hospital and the Special Service Squadron took over the other buildings. Fortunately nothing was seriously damaged during the 18-minute "friendly-fire" bombardment by Portland and Bullard. In short order, Majuro Atoll became a thriving forward operating naval base with an airstrip quickly built for local defense. Jones and his VAC Amphibious Reconnaissance Company were inbound for a fierce fire fight on the small islands of the Eniwetok Atoll.

==== Eniwetok, February–March 1944 ====
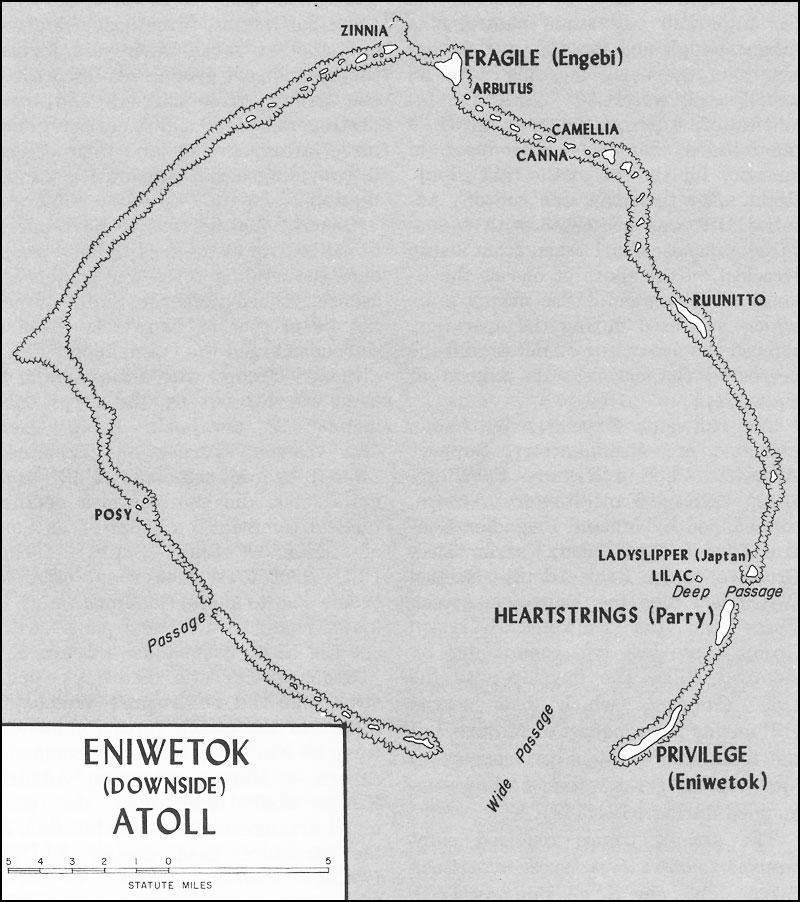

Eniwetok, meaning "Land between West and East" in Marshallese, was known for an excellent anchorage, with an immense lagoon stretching 21 miles (34 km) north–southwise and 17 miles (27 km) east-to-west providing the largest lagoon in the Marshalls. The circular-shaped atoll of Eniwetok lies 326 miles (520 km) WNW of Roi-Namur and 1,000 miles (1,600 km) from the Mariana Islands, making up some forty islets that comprise the Eniwetok Atoll. Operation CATCHPOLE was involved in the planned occupation of Truk, Kusaie, Wake, and the Eniwetok Islands (DOWNSIDE). Most of the islands in DOWNSIDE covered an area approximately 2.25 square miles (5.8 km^{2}).

The VAC Amphib Recon Company under Capt. James Jones was attached to Task Group One (TG-1) 7 – February 25, 1944, cooperating with Capt. Katzenbach's scouting unit, Company D, 4th Division. The plan was to coordinate the 22nd Marines with the 106th Infantry Regiment (minus BLT 2/106). Intelligence estimated an enemy strength of twenty-nine hundred to four thousand on the entire atoll.

Kane sailed for DOWNSIDE, on February 15, 1944, with Task Group 51.14 in USS Kane (APD-18), entering the lagoon of Eniwetok at 0900, February 17, anchoring at 1145. Their plan was to reconnoiter and seize Aitsu (CAMELLIA) and Rujiyoru (CANNA) in order to allow a joint artillery battery emplacement, consisting of the 104th Field Artillery and the 2nd Separate Pack Howitzer Battalion, to establish a fire base for bombardment on the targeted northern islet of Engebi.

Upon receiving orders that H-Hour would be scheduled at 1230, Capt. Jones transferred VAC Amphib Recon Company from USS Kane to their landing ship as instructed, then loaded onto the amphibious tractor, for the prepared landings on CANNA and CAMELLIA.

They were supported by gun power from two nearby infantry landing crafts. Splitting the recon company in half, Capt. Jones, two of his officers, and fifty-seven recon Marines boarded three LVTs and landed on CAMELLIA Island at 1320, February 17, 1944. Some difficulty was encountered when two of the LVTs were stuck in the impermeable sand along the beachhead, barely able to maneuver them to a more solid sand bank. But by 1355, quickly finding that it was unoccupied, CAMELLIA was secure with no Japanese forces nor natives on the island. Meanwhile, Executive Officer 1st Lieutenant Merwyn Silverthorn also using three LVTs with four officers and fifty-seven men, landed ten minutes later at 1330 with the other half of the recon company on CANNA Island. CANNA was unoccupied except by twenty-five natives. The islet was secure at 1400.

After useful information translated by interpreter William Mueller, five of the natives informed the Marines on the disposition and strength of Japanese defense forces. They discovered that at least 1000 Japanese troops were on each of the three main islands; Parry Island (HEARTSTRINGS), Eniwetok (PRIVILEGE) and Engebi (FRAGILE), plus 1000 laborers. However, no further information was obtained whether or not there were Japanese on the other islands.

While the recon Marines from VAC Amphib Recon Company were seizing the "artillery islands", the United States Navy Underwater Demolition Teams, also using amphibious tractors, or amtracs, were conducting underwater reconnaissance. The UDT swimmers would reconnoiter fifty feet from the shore of FRAGILE, casting from LVTs. Their main focus was to locate submerged obstacles that could dismay a landing force and naval mines.

The joint-Marine and Army artillery battery began their emplacement on both CAMELLIA and CANNA, landing at around 1500. As soon as they were ashore, the recon Marines reembarked, leaving behind Lt. Shinn's 1st Platoon across the inter-islet channel of COLUMBINE to provide security for the Marine's 2nd Separate Pack-Howitzer Battalion. However, 104th's Field Artillery Battalion on CAMELLIA already had a sufficient number of soldiers providing their own security.

At 1600 on D-Day (D-0), using their rubber boats, Minnear's 2nd Platoon and Weeks's 4th Platoon patrolled the island of BUTTERCUP that lay immediately northwest and adjacent from CANNA and CAMELLIA. After finding it unoccupied, they proceeded to reconnoiter CARNATION and COLUMBINE, reaching it by 1700. They found these two islands also unoccupied.

Meantime, Lt. Silverthorn and his fifty-seven recon Marines returned to Jones and the remaining company. With VAC Amphib Recon Company rejoined, they dug in and spent the night on a nearby, unoccupied island of BITTERROOT. By 1902, it was confirmed that both artillery batteries had been fully emplaced with target firing base area registered for ready.

Crossing the channel through the heavy surf toward a small islet west of FRAGILE, Capt. Katzenbach's Scout Company, the 4th Marine Division landed on Bogen (ZINNIA) on the morning of February 18, (D+1). After scouting and reconnoitering, by 0327 it was declared unoccupied and secured, becoming the last amphibious reconnaissance mission before the main landing assault on FRAGILE. The captured islets of CAMELLIA, CANNA and ZINNIA prevented the enemy from fleeing and "island-hopping" to a nearby island, potentially to regroup with reinforcements or settle into defensive fortifications, awaiting the American Marine/Navy Fleet.

Preceded by extensive naval gunfire and aerial bombardments, the 22nd Marines landed an assault on FRAGILE against the defended Japanese. One Marine was killed and two wounded from fire coming from the fierce firefight on FRAGILE. As an indication of how low the fire was, all of these Marines were lying flat on the ground when hit. Also, enemy coconut log bunkers were centralized and interconnected with complex trenches dug and constructed in a manner of radiating from its hub, covered with hidden spider holes. The Marines quickly resolved the issue by dropping incendiary or smoke grenades; the smoke would eventually convey through the covered trenches exposing all the hidden, unpredictable trap doors.

While the 22nd Marines and 106th Infantry were in the process of capturing Engebi Island (FRAGILE), both Jones's and Katzenbach's recon and scouts captured a Japanese soldier while reconnoitering the eight other 'unoccupied' islands in the area. At 0900 on February 18, on D+1 just southeast of FRAGILE, landing on Muzingbaarkikku (ARBUTUS) "friendly-fire" hit three recon Marines, injuring two and later killing one while being evacuated to the ship. Apparently the rounds were dispersed from Marines on Engebi, firing machine guns onto a Japanese-held defense on Skunk Point. Using 60-mm mortars, the recon team was able to gain the western edge of ARBUTUS on the reef passage facing Engebi, and was ordered to secure it overnight to D+2 to flank any fleeing Japanese troops from FRAGILE.

Around the afternoon of D+1, sometime around 1640, the two joint-Marine/Army infantry regiments officially secured FRAGILE. The 22nd Marines and the Army's 106th Infantry along with the 104th Artillery reembarked the USS Kane for an upcoming assault on Parry Island (HEARTSTRINGS). This made the 2nd Marine Artillery available to pack up and reinforce Jones if necessary.

Marine General Thomas Watson carefully observed the continuous hard assault and casualties on Engebi, or FRAGILE, and decided to wait for the seizure of the main Japanese bastion on HEARTSTRINGS. Captured documents taken on FRAGILE confirmed that HEARTSTRINGS was strongly held and contained an artillery element. On D+2, General Watson ordered both the recon and scout Marine companies, to continue reconnoitering the string of islets to the west and the eastern islets of DOWNSIDE. The Marine Scouts headed for the eastern islets heading south and found Elugelab (SAGEBRUSH) unoccupied, but at Rigili (POSY) they killed nine Japanese soldiers. Meanwhile, VAC Amphib Recon Company, (minus his headquarters platoon), with Lt. Lassiter's mortar platoon headed to the eastern islets and continued south en route to Japtan (LADYSLIPPER).

Weeks's 4th Platoon reinforced with some attached mortarmen conducted a recon of LILAC, a small islet west of the Deep Passage, midway between LADYSLIPPER AND HEARTSTRINGS, on the morning of D+3, February 21. Although they found the island secured, they found it was recently occupied by the enemy. The island once had a Japanese flag on a tall mast and a sunken Japanese landing barge offshore. At this time, Task Force-55 landed two infantry regiments, the 22nd Marines and the Army's 106th, the landing force against heavy Japanese resistance on the capital island of Eniwetok (PRIVILEGE).

Close to 1800 on D+3, Jones and his entire company landed on LADYSLIPPER with Lt. Lassiter's mortar platoon for securing the beachhead, while Jones's company maneuvered into line skirmishes and held his right flank on the lagoon-side, proceeding south. Reaching the Deep Passage that separates the islets of LADYSLIPPER and HEARTSTRINGS, without any incident, they circled back to north up along the eastside – seaward of the island.

Meanwhile, Jones's company declared LADYSLIPPER secured at 1929 after finding no sights of any enemy occupation and waited for the inbound ship USS Kane to arrive. VAC Recon Company embarked the USS Kane at 1345 while the 2nd Marine Artillery battery disembarked Kane and unpacked their howitzers with Lassiter's mortar platoon as their security.

On the morning of D+4, February 22, 1944, the battalion landing teams (BLTs) beached onto HEARTSTRINGS and PRIVILEGE, preceded by naval gunfire, aerial bombardment and artillery barrages. Parry Island took most of the heavy-weighted gunfire out of the whole DOWNSIDE operation. While the beaches were covered in smoke from the early bombardment, confusion caused three infantry landing crafts (LCIs) to be fired on by the naval Task Force. The Marines hit the beaches at 0908 with two battalion landing teams, the 1st (1/22) and 2nd Battalions (2/22) of the Regimental Combat Team, and the 22nd Marines, or RCT-22. The 3rd Battalion, 22nd Marines (3/22) landed for a follow-in trace and were immediately engaged by the Japanese with small-arms fire and mortars.

Jones was pre-briefed of a recon mission of Parry Island, or HEARTSTRINGS at 1230, D+4. His orders were to regroup his whole company (including headquarters personnel) and land his VAC Recon Company with the 4th Division's Scouts Company onto 'GREEN Beach #2' of HEARTSTRINGS and augment into the 1st and 2nd Battalion of RCT-22. Landing at 1320 in a covered landing, Jones reported to the commanding officer of RCT-22, Colonel John T. Walker. In turn, he was immediately ordered to report to Lt. Colonel Donn C. Hart, the commanding officer of the battalion landing team 2/22. In a decision to split Jones's company into two recon teams, executive officer 1st Lt. Silverthorn was sent with Corey's 3rd and Weeks's 4th Platoon along with a divided half of the detached mortar platoon to augment Company F (FOX), while Jones took Shinn's 1st and Minnear's 2nd Platoon to Company E (EASY), who had been in fierce battle for six hours. This provided about fifty-five extra men to each rifle company. The larger force now available enabled each company to complete a push against the enemy to the sea.

Jones placed the 1st Platoon on the left flank and the 2nd Platoon on the right and advanced with EASY Company for the final 250 yards of the beach. Joined by four light tanks, the recon platoons were 'mopping-up' any bypassed enemy snipers. Reaching 50 yards, the platoons rushed passed EASY's assault elements to push the remaining enemy to the sea. Conferring with the EASY Company commander, Jones's recon element took over the enemy beach defense.

However, Silverthorn's recon element had more difficulty. While FOX, between EASY and GEORGE Company, was securing the beach approaching at 25 yards, they came across an area honeycombed with dugouts filled with snipers in connecting emplacements along the beach. Silverthorn and his platoons could see if they needed the help of flame throwers and demolitions. After a brief withdrawal to some 30 yards from the beach, they regrouped with necessary additional firepower. In short order, they overran the Japanese defenses, sustaining four casualties during the action. Withdrawing for the night, the recon troops were phased into FOX Company's Main Line of Resistance. During the night, the company accounted for about 15 enemy dead without loss to themselves.

On the next morning of February 24, 1944, the commanding officer of 22nd Marines detached VAC Amphib Recon Company at 1030 and withdrew to the beach where they embarked aboard a LCT for further transfer to the APD USS Kane. Upon orders of Task Group-One (TG-1), the VAC Amphibious Reconnaissance Company was transferred to USS Neville (AP-16) at 1130, and were en route for Pearl Harbor at 1600, February 25, 1944.

Upon arrival to Camp Catlin, the Commander of V Amphibious Corps (VAC) General Holland M. Smith awarded 1st Lieutenant Weeks the Bronze Star for actions on Eniwetok and presented VAC Amphibious Reconnaissance Company the special commendations endorsed by Commandant General Alexander Archer Vandegrift. Fleet Admiral Chester W. Nimitz presented Capt. James Jones his second Legion of Merit, signed by United States Secretary of the Navy James Forrestal.

=== The Mariana Islands ===
The four largest islands of Guam, Rota, Saipan and Tinian, replaced Truk as the next series of islands for seizure in the Mariana Islands, or Operation FORAGER, becoming logical strategic targets. Saipan and Tinian, being the northernmost islands in the Marianas, were the landing objectives for General Smith's V Amphibious Corps – consisting of the 2nd and 4th Marine Divisions, with the Army's 27th Infantry Division as the V Amphib Corps' Reserve component. The seizure of Guam in the southern Marianas was tasked by Major General Roy S. Geiger, whose III Amphibious Corps (composed of the 3rd Marine Division, 1st Provisional Marine Brigade and the Army's 77th Infantry Division).

In the center of the Marianas, or FORAGER lies Saipan, only 1,250 miles (2,000 km) from Tokyo, Japan. It was known at that time, the "Pearl Harbor of Japan", being the main administrative headquarters for all of the Japanese forces in the western Pacific. All the supplies and troops were funneled through Saipan that made up the whole of Japan's defense forces, their inner defense line.

The island of Tinian lies 2.5 miles (4 km) south across the channel from Saipan. It was considered to contain the best airfields in the Marianas that catered to the Pacific campaign. One of the airfields was the launch site for the B-29 Bomber Enola Gay, which dropped the atom bomb on Hiroshima. They only major town at that time was Tinian Town, which centered at its mass, a 9,000-man Japanese defense force led by Japanese Colonel Keishi Ogata. All the Marine assault commanders confirmed by aerial photography and reconnaissance flown from nearby Saipan that the 2,000-yard wide sandy beach along Sunharon Bay, on the southwest side of Tinian, was the most heavily defended of all possible usable beaches.

On the eastern side of Tinian at Asuga Bay, were more beaches chosen for contingency beach landings, which would encompass around the 25-foot cliffs for beach exits. These two beaches at Asuga Bay were designated as YELLOW #1 and #2, which also contained formidable Japanese defenses. YELLOW #1 was 355 yards long and YELLOW #2 was 200 yards long. The small, white-sanded beaches at Hagoi on western Tinian were the only potential beaches capable of permitting LVTs, DUKWs, artillery trucks and supply vehicles. Being designated as WHITE #1 and #2, these beaches were scarcely defended by approximately one company of a Japanese defense force.

Aboard the command ship USS Rocky Mount (AGC-3), a tense, contentious conflict erupted between Admiral Kelly Turner and General Holland Smith over which beach was suitable for a major beach landing. But General Holland M. Smith resolved upon a landing on WHITE #1 and WHITE #2 since they were able to receive artillery support from Saipan and would provide the element of surprise. General Smith had the full support of Admiral Hill, who was in charge of the entire operation.

However, Admiral Turner adamantly opposed considering any beachhead landing on the WHITE beaches. He instead reasoned that WHITE #1 was only 60 to 75 yards wide and WHITE #2 was only 135 to 160 yards wide, with depth of between 15 and 20 yards, making it impractical for two divisions to land a large beach assault. But the WHITE beaches had a relatively smooth off-lying reef shelf 300 yards long and it was felt LVTs and LCVPs could disembark troops who could wade ashore. Also, landing on WHITE away from the main Japanese defenses onto an essentially undefended beach was a better approach then landing on Turner's proposed beaches at Tinian Town.

Another factor to consider was the short over-water distance from Saipan, which lies 3 miles (5 km) across the Saipan Channel. The landing force could preload on Saipan without having to organize itself for a typical ship-to-shore landing. Also, by landing on the northern tip of Tinian, most of the island would be within the fan and range of General Smith's thirteen artillery battalions that were sited hub-to-hub on the southern slopes of Saipan.

Aerial reconnaissance revealed that the Japanese were fully aware of the United States's interest in the beaches off Tinian Town and were making last minute improvements to their defenses on beaches of YELLOW, BLUE, GREEN #1 and #2, Red #1 and #2 and ORANGE.

==== Saipan, June 1944 ====
D-Day was originally set for June 15, 1944. The VAC Amphib Recon Battalion departed Pearl Harbor on May 28 aboard the USS Stringham (APD-6) and the USS Cambria (APA-36). Alpha Company was tasked for a D-1 night beach landing to seize the 1,554-foot Mount Tapochau center of the island. Fortunately, the mission was canceled.

BRAVO Company landed early in the afternoon on D-Day and on June 17, BRAVO Company joined with rest of the battalion at Chalan Kanoa. The battalion carried out a variety of assignments, such as Command Post Security and the "mopping up" of bypassed Japanese defenders and sniper patrols. Also, BRAVO would patrol out of the larger town of Garapan while the assault divisions moved north on the island.

After thirty-nine days of intense close combat by the battalion landing teams supported by naval gunfire, artillery and close air support, Admiral Turner and General Holland Smith declared Saipan secured on July 9, 1944. The Americans suffered 3,225 killed in action and 13,061 wounded. The Japanese totaled 23,811 dead. The POWs numbered 928, and 838 Koreans and 10,258 Japanese civilians were interned.

==== Tinian, July 1944 ====
The VAC Amphib Recon Battalion was alerted on July 3 of the Tinian mission and were handed orders on July 9, to reconnoiter the YELLOW and WHITE beaches. Given the time, Major James Jones tasked his two-company battalion for rehearsals as they embarked from Stone Pier on BLUE Beach and transited to their rehearsal area on two PURPLE beaches of Magicienne Bay on Saipan through the night of 9 – July 10.

The actual mission was scheduled to be conducted throughout the evening of 10 – July 11, 1944; Alpha Company and UDT 7 (Silverthorn and Burke) were to reconnoiter beach YELLOW #1 on the eastern side of Tinian while BRAVO Company and UDT 5 (Shinn and Kaufmann) were assigned to reconnoiter WHITE #1 and #2 beaches on the northwestern side. They were asked for location and nature of the obstacles on the beach and the height and characteristics of the cliffs and the vegetation behind the beaches, in addition to the depth of water and the characteristics of the off-lying reef. Also, they were to give an appraisal of types of landing crafts that could be landed on each particular beach, plus the types of vehicles which could cross the reef and move inland. General Holland M. Smith also requested their estimate as to whether the infantry could climb the cliffs without ladders or cargo nets.

Major Jones with Capt. Silverthorn's Company A accompanied by UDT Team 7 under Navy Lieutenant Richard F. Burke embarked onto USS Stringham (DD-83), while Shinn's Company B embarked on the USS Gilmer (DD-233) with UDT Team 5 under Lt. Commander Draper L. Kauffman. The APDs carried the joint-reconnaissance force to a point just offshore of Tinian. Faces colored with black and silver nonreflective face paint, they donned cammies or cut-off shorts made from utility trousers with soft covers as headgear. To avoid their feet being cut and torn by the coral, they either wore coral or tennis shoes, or an occasional pair of boondockers. Also, every sailor and Marine had a small inflation bladder (usually not inflated), providing positive buoyancy when required.

Armed with only Ka-Bar or Fairbairn-Sykes combat knives, the recon Marines and the UDT Teams disembarked from their APDs. The recon Marines used eight rubber boats for each beach while the UDT teams were in two rubber boats for each beach, and were towed by Higgins boats to within 400 to 500 yards offshore from the beach. Two Marines were left in each boat to paddle them to keep them stationary off from the beaches while the swimmers went to their objectives, YELLOW Beach off Tinian Town, and WHITE #1 and #2 in the northwestern portion of the island.

The Navy UDT and the recon Marines were accustomed to different reconnoitering methods, the Marines, reconnoitering the beach and the land inward, scouted the size and location of exits inland through the hills and dunes, the UDT, conducting underwater reconnaissance found that the shelving reef had only a few ragged breaks in its sea edge for the amphibian tractors to avoid.

Silverthorn's Alpha Company and Burke's UDT 7 disembarked from the USS Stringham at 2100 and were towed to their position off YELLOW #1 (Asuga) Beach. The UDT found anchored mines, numerous potholes and coral heads. The hydrography of YELLOW #1 made it negatively inconclusive to land a beach assault. At 2232, the moonlight conveyed through the recently heavy clouds and revealed double-apron barbed wire along the beaches.

2nd Lieutenant Donald Neff of Alpha Company worked his way inland about 30 yards, silently evading a Japanese sentry that was having a cigarette. As he was looking for beach exits for tracked and wheeled vehicles, sounds of explosives were heard from a nearby beach. The UDT interpreted the explosion that had been spotted and departed the area since the security orders were to avoid disclosure of any landing intentions. Also, if any mines or obstacles were encountered, they were not to be disturbed. On the other hand, the Marines that were closer to the beach later surmised that the Japanese were working on their beach fortifications in hasty construction of trenches and blockhouses, and proceeded with their reconnaissance.

Occasionally, Japanese sentries patrolling atop the twenty-five-foot escarpments flanking YELLOW #1 would shine flashlights onto the beach below but Silverthorn's Marines were never detected. Although one enemy patrol walked within a few yards of the Marines, they failed to spot them. They returned to the Stringham at 0200 with "negative" collective information in consideration of using YELLOW #1 for beach landings. The results were conclusive. Moored mines, pot holes, large boulders, barbed wire on the beaches as well as pillboxes, hundred-foot cliffs at each end flanking the beach, and more fortifications being developed by the Japanese made the beaches totally undesirable.

To the northwest, Lieutenant Leo Shinn's Bravo Company immediately had problems the moment they disembarked from USS Gilmer at 2130. Originally, Shinn had split his team into two, one aiming for WHITE #1 (the most northern of the two) and the other team for WHITE #2. A strong northerly tidal current had carried WHITE #1 team north, landing on a coral outcropping about 800 yards north of Tinian. If not for the coral outcrop, the strong tide would have carried them farther into the Saipan Channel. The other team that was heading for WHITE #2 ended up on WHITE #1 instead, in which they made a hasty reconnaissance. Also, the northerly current plus low scudding clouds at night made it extremely difficult to locate the recovery rubber boats, moving them north from their extraction pickup point. Two Marines, Gunnery Sergeant Sam Lanford and PFC John Sebern were aware that they could not stay near the WHITE beaches as it would jeopardize the entire operation if caught. They swam out into the Tinian Channel that separated Saipan and Tinian, using their partially inflated flotation bladders stuffed in their dungaree jackets. After treading water for a few hours, they were recovered by the USS Dickerson (APD-21), a picket boat patrolling the channel. UDT's Lt. Commander Kaufmann underwent a similar swim for recovery and was also recovered by Dickerson. Company B as a whole returned with partial report on only WHITE #1.

Major Jones was not completely satisfied with the first night's reconnaissance. Jones reassigned Capt "Silver" Silverthorn to redo both WHITE #1 and #2 due to his successful recon of YELLOW #1 the night prior. Knowing the critical mission in obtaining pertinent information, Silver arranged six two-man swimmer teams of one officer and one senior staff NCO each, eliminating any junior ranked enlisted on the second night of reconnaissance, 11 – July 12, 1944. Alpha Company's executive officer, Lieutenant Weeks, took MGySgt Pat Patrick, the only Bravo Company swimmer along with Silver's Company 1st Sergeant Ken Arzt, and lieutenants Wayne Pepper, Paul Taylor, Ted Toole and "Mac" MacGregor; each with their respective platoon sergeants. The six teams headed for the WHITE beaches, three on WHITE #1 and three on WHITE #2.

Taking the extra step, he requested more definite radar tracking of his boats from the APD to the beaches. Towing a rubber boat mounted a metal tripod wrapped in wire mesh with their highly radar-visible steel "pot" helmets, this provided a good, solid radar "target" for USS Stringham. This allowed the 'combined' recon teams to accurately land on their assigned beaches while they corresponded through their SCR-300 radio for course directions.

Their observation of the three- to five-foot cliff just inland from the beach permitted the LVT units to engineer a simple yet ingenious design of a deployable, portable ramp with its frame made from timbers. This allowed them to potentially exit the LVT over the obstacle as they were immediately dropped in place. The wheeled and tracked vehicles were able funnel their way inland from the narrow beaches. They successfully confirmed the usability of WHITE #1 and #2 for the major landing assaults to follow. The recon Marines accomplished their missions without the loss of a single man and were able to bring back sketches as well as samples of the vegetation for study.

As Silverthorn briefed Admiral Hill, Hill kept pressuring for Silverthorn's opinion on the WHITE beaches. To convince Admiral Hill, Silverthorn emphatically said...

"Admiral, the beaches are narrow... [but] there are no mines, no coral heads, no boulders, no wire, no boat obstacles and no offshore reefs. The beaches are as flat as a billiard table!"

Armed with this factual data, General Smith and Admiral Hill returned to Admiral Turner expecting a change in his policy. Nothing changed. He simply would not listen, and again ordered Smith and Hill in very positive terms to stop all White Beach planning. Admiral Hill went over Adm. Turner's head, going directly to Admiral Spruance and uproariously argued along with Generals Smith and Harry Schmidt for use of the WHITE beaches. Spruance, not wanting to nullify his subordinate, Turner, summoned a conference. Alleviating their tempers and differing opinions, the results of the reconnaissance were presented; he requested a vote beginning with the most junior officer present. All voted "Yea" and anxiously looked to Turner, who, after a pause, finally added his approval;, the WHITE beaches were ultimately chosen.

Two weeks later at dawn, the battle for Tinian was commenced on July 24, 1944, when the 4th Marine Division landed on the two small WHITE beaches. They attacked 1500 yards inland before suffering their first casualty. With aid from the 2nd Marine Division, it took nine days to seize Tinian and declare it secured, on August 1, 1944, the same day Guam was declared secured. The extremely difficult operation was almost perfectly executed, and the landing force operations officer, Colonel Robert E. Hogaboom, credited this from the high competence of the preliminary reconnaissance.

The Amphibious Reconnaissance Battalion, VAC, boarded the destroyer USS Azalea City and departed for Pearl Harbor on 9 August, arriving at Camp Catlin, Hawaiʻi, on August 20, 1944. When V (Fifth) Amphibious Corps returned from Tinian, the V (Fifth) Amphibious Corps (VAC), was redesignated as Fleet Marine Force, Pacific on August 26, 1944. Subsequently, the Amphib Recon Battalion also made a titular change from VAC Amphib Recon Bn to FMF Amphib Recon Bn.

=== Iwo Jima, January–March 1945 ===
Through the dates January 16–24, 1945, 1st Lieutenant Russell Corey, Commanding Officer of B Company, or BAKER Company, embarked along with his Marines aboard USS Bladen (APA-63) and performed command-post exercises (CPXs) around the beaches of Hawaiʻi for preparation for amphib recon beach landings on Iwo Jima. Three days later on January 27, they departed, arriving off the coast on February 18.

Originally, the entire BAKER Company was to prepare for a pre-D-Day amphib recon of Iwo Jima's beaches; instead Lt. Corey was given further orders to detach three of his amphib recon Marines from B Company, FMF Amphib Recon Battalion and composite them into a 'provisional' amphibious reconnaissance unit.

The purpose of the temporary consolidated amphib recon unit was to save precious time by embarking a mixed crew of recon Marines and UDT in gathering valuable information and bringing it back to their own respective intelligence sections for processing. This unit was composed of Marines from the Scout and Sniper Companies of the 4th Marine and 5th Marine Divisions and sailors from four UDT Teams of #12, #13, #14 and #15.

The "provisional" amphib recon unit embarked the USS Blessman (APD-48) for Iwo Jima, along with four other APDs USS Bull (APD-78), USS Bates (APD-47) and USS Barr (APD-39); carrying the other tasked UDT sailors and Recon Marines that were to conduct their pre-D-Day amphib recon on the eastern beaches of Iwo Jima on D-3, three days prior to D-Day.

Next day on February 17, 1945, D-2 the next pre-D-Day beach landing was unusually conducted during the daytime, but had been preceded by naval gunfire which commenced at 0700. Battleships USS Idaho (BB-42), USS Nevada (BB-36) and USS Tennessee (BB-43) bombarded the beaches as they closed in at three thousand yards from the shore. By 1025, Rear Admiral William Brandy ordered the fire-support to cease; meanwhile the cruiser USS Pensacola (CA-24) took six direct hits in the exchange of fire as they Japanese batteries ashore opened fire onto the minesweepers while it observed the Japanese batteries open fire on the minesweepers. The USS Pensacola silenced the offending batteries within five minutes.

When the minesweepers were finished, the UDT and recon Marines disembarked onto their Higgins boats and immediately lashed the rubber boats to the starboard side, then proceeded to their designated beach. They dropped the UDT and Marine swimmers into the water. Most of the swimmers coated themselves in Navy water pump grease since at that time, no cold-water exposure suits had been invented. At the same time, the B-29 bombers and the battleships continued their bombing raids. Because of the naval gunfire and aerial bombardment, the Japanese commander, General Kuribayashi, mistakenly sensed that the Americans were coming in for a main invasion and opened fire. The infantry landing crafts and the enemy Japanese forces began exchanging fire from their 20 mm, 40 mm and 4.5-inch rockets over the combat swimmers (both the Marines and UDT) in the water.

Three recon teams embarked onto Higgins boats with each of the recon teams accompanied by the Navy's UDT swimmers. One recon Marine from each conglomerated team acted as photographer, and remained aboard the Higgins boats to take photographs of the beach defenses. Towards shore, the boats strafed side-to-side towards shore while the men crouched low as possible to avoid being hit by incoming enemy fire. The LCI(G)s were constantly under heavy enemy fire from hidden, well-covered batteries in the high ground, just north of the beaches at the base of Mount Suribachi. Heavy batteries would repeatedly lay suppressive fire by using light mortars, machine guns, rifle fire, and occasionally antiboat guns.

The eastern beaches were photographically reconnoitered left-to-right by Sergeant Jim Burns and Captain Reynolds on GREEN Beach under the southeastern corner of Suribachi. Sgt. Clete Peacock covered RED Beach #1 in the center and Sgt. Robert Cole covered RED Beach #2 on the right, where Futatsu Rock separated RED #1 from RED #2. Both Burns and Peacock used a Contax 35 mm camera, and Cole used a Leica camera.

Once they completed their objectives, they planned to extract from the sea by rubber boats towed from the Higgins LCIs and quickly headed to the gunboats. Meantime, fighter planes came in laying smoke while the destroyers were firing white phosphorus shells to cover their withdrawal. Every one of the twelve LCI(G)s had been hit or was sinking. One of the landing crafts, LCI(G) #466, was still afloat and in operational conditions due to the heavy incoming fire. It allowed some Marines to board it and exit the danger zone immediately. Despite the heavy fire, it proved to be an advantageous opportunity as it exposed their positions in the well-hidden bunkers.

While on board #466, Sergeant Jim Burns, one of the recon photographers, and Ensign Frank Jirka, a UDT liaison officer, were both hit by shrapnel; Burns in his arm, torso and eye; Jirka in his legs. Most of the wounded were brought onto the USS Tennessee for treating severe casualties and the mildly wounded. Sgt. Burns turned in his Contax camera, along with vital and pertinent intelligence, to Captain Reynolds for use in briefing the commanders. Afterwards, he was medically evacuated to Hawaiʻi and returned to the continental United States, receiving a Bronze Star for his actions. Ensign Jirka, on the other hand, lost both of his legs.

By late afternoon at 1600 on D-2, the same recon/UDT team, less casualty and wounded, reconnoitered the western beaches of BROWN, WHITE and ORANGE, both their #1 and #2. The UDT sailors conducted their underwater reconnaissance sweeping for enemy mines, natural or man-made obstacles; the recon Marines charted beach reconnaissance and continued onward inland, both working in the same littoral beach area. They all returned to ship by 1800. The photographs proved to be invaluable and the commanders were briefed about the situations and what to expect on the beaches.

The Navy UDT teams and three recon Marines from Company B, FMF Amphib Recon Bn, under the command of Marine Sergeant Melvin C. Holland, reported that they discovered only one underwater ship mine of the western beaches and had blown it with detonated explosives. There were no land minefields nor submerged obstacles on either of the eastern and western beaches. D-Day was permitted to be on schedule by two days with sufficient beach intelligence, to include the gradients and surf conditions and beach permeability.

Both the APD USS Blessman (DE-69) and USS Gamble (DD-123), a destroyer–minesweeper, were under an enemy aerial raid. One of the joint-Navy/Marine recon teams were aboard the USS Blessman. Blessman departed the beach area and rendezvoused with the 'Gunfire and Covering Force' offshore, commanded by Rear Admiral Roger. Roughly around 2130, two planes made a stern approach on Blessman, dropping a bomb that passed down through its hull. The munition plunged itself through to the forward fireroom. Sustaining a substantial amount of damage, forty-two men on board were either killed or missing. Among those killed was Sergeant Holland.

Later, on February 20 (D-Day +1), Lieutenant Russell Corey, 125 Marines with six officers from BAKER Company, FMF Amphib Recon Bn landed by a Higgins boat late in the evening. Waiting until dawn, Corey and his Marines quickly moved west along the beachhead toward the perimeter line of 28th Marines near the base of Mt. Suribachi, where Lieutenant Corey and his Marines ended up staying for a number of days – reporting daily to the command post that lay a little farther north from their location. The command post, the recon units and advance party landed on February 23, 1945, D-Day +4.

Following the assault since D-Day on Iwo Jima, Corey and BAKER Company of FMF Amphibious Recon Bn, disembarked in twelve amphibious tractors from Company C, 2nd Armored Amphibious Tractor Battalion with orders to reconnoiter the northwestern coast of Iwo Jima. Lt. Corey and his Marines reached Kama Rock and Kangoku Rock by March 12, 1945. They speculated that some Japanese coast-watchers were in the vicinity helping adjust their fire upon the American ships during three weeks ago in the beginning phases of the battle. After finding no evidence, except a stone emplacement and some caves recently vacated from Japanese presence, Lt. Corey and B Company reboarded the LVTs and returned the VAC Corps headquarters on Iwo Jima.

Lt. Russell Corey radioed Major James Jones (who was with the remaining FMF Amphib Recon Bn, Company A) in Pearl Harbor, HI and debriefed him of Company B's successful mission on Iwo Jima. Jones ordered Corey to take BAKER Company to the 'newly-Allied occupied' island of Saipan, arriving on March 19, 1945, for a few weeks to allow the amphib recon Marines to recuperate and replace any of their damaged equipment, for preparation of the upcoming operation in the Okinawa Islands. Meantime, Major Jones and Company ABLE proceeded toward Okinawa. On March 26, 1945, in the absence of Corey's BAKER Company, Iwo Jima was declared secured.

=== Okinawa Islands, March–June 1945 ===
Before the operation of the Okinawa Islands, or codename ICEBERG, Major Jones's FMF Amphib Recon Battalion (minus BRAVO Company) was directed to be attached and to assist and train the scout soldiers of the 3rd Battalion, 305th and 306th Infantry Regiments from the Army 77th Infantry Division's scout soldiers in preliminary pre-D-Day amphibious reconnaissance.

Since the beaches of Hawaiʻi closely resemble the beaches of ICEBERG, Jones and ABLE Company (the rest FMF Amphib Recon Battalion) made several practice beach recon landings with 77th Division's Scouts and left immediately to rendezvous with Rear Admiral Ingolf N. Kiland's Western Islands Attack Group, heading for ICEBERG. Still aboard the two APDs, they arrived in the East China Sea, off the coast of the small, volcanic and peaklike islands of Kerama Retto on March 25, 1945, four days prior to L-Day.

Early March in 1945, they disembarked onto the USS Scribner (APD-122) and USS Kinzer (APD-91) from Pearl Harbor in Hawaiʻi, en route to Leyte. Meanwhile, Lt. Corey and BRAVO Company of FMFPAC Amphib Recon Bn, were en route to Saipan for refitting and recuperation from their previous missions on Iwo Jima.

Admiral Turner wanted both the recon assets (Jones's Battalion and Army 77th Scouts) to land on Kerama Retto and Keise Shima, the western islets of ICEBERG for preliminary L-Day reconnaissance. He planned for further seizure due to its excellent anchorage for their ships to harbor for naval projection during the rest of the ICEBERG operation.

Their objectives were to seize offshore enemy artillery bases from which the mixed, "sea-based" Army/Marine 'provisional' field artillery battery could fire their 155-mm "Long Toms" and other artillery at hand for support for the upcoming main landing on Okinawa.

Beginning on the nights of 25 – March 26, 1945, L-Day minus 7–6 days, Jones's ABLE Company of FMFPAC Amphib Recon Battalion, led by company commander Capt. Merwyn Silverthorn, disembarked the USS Scribner and Kinzer and landed in the Keise Shima islets of Kuefo Shima, Naganna Shima and Kamiyama Shima. Finding the islands unoccupied of enemy Japanese defenders or coastwatchers, the Navy UDT teams came offshore and blew up coral with explosive charges for clearing a passage for the upcoming joint-provisional artillery elements.

Meanwhile, Major Jones, the commanding officer of FMFPAC Amphib Recon Battalion ordered Lt. Corey and BRAVO Company to board on to the next available APD-54 USS Chase (DE-158) at Saipan and arrive to the Okinawa Islands to reinforce Jones and the rest of FMF Amphib Recon Battalion (particularly Major Jones and ABLE Company) by April 1. Later that day, the 77th Scouts landed in the Kerama Retto Islands and Silverthorn's ALPHA Company continued their mission reconnoitering the islands throughout Keise Shima. ALPHA Company landed ashore the southern tip of Awara Saki on Tokashiki at L-5, one of the larger islands that rests in the islands of Kerama Rhetto. It too was found unoccupied.

Next day on L-4, ABLE Company landed on Mae Shima and Kuro Shima. At around 0630 in the morning, a Japanese kamikaze boat attacked head on, while they attempted to land on Mae Shima but Capt. Silverthorn's amphib recon Marines opened fire with suppressive fire from their automotive weapons; when it approached 300 yards they blew it up, quickly putting it out of commission. During the kamikaze attacks, the USS Hinsdale (APA-120), two of the amphibious ships of Demonstration Group CHARLIE, and the tank landing ship LST 844 were struck.

On April 1, 1945, BRAVO Company arrived on L-Day, off the beaches of the east coast at Minatoga to join the 2nd Marine Division for support in their landings. With Major Jones now with his reassembled FMFPAC Amphib Recon Battalion (including Headquarters Company and its weapons platoon), they were temporarily attached under the echelon of the 'Eastern Islands Attack and Fire Support Group'.

At 0200 on April 5, 1945 (L+6), Major Jones with his whole subordinate command of FMFPAC Amphib Recon deployed two of his companies, A and B Company, for reconnaissance of the six islets guarding Chimu Wan for enemy presence and beachhead landing information. And along with the amphib recon battalions' headquarters company reinforced and weapons platoon, accompanying the Marines was a small unit of war dogs and handlers. Preceding the main battalion recon landing was a small team of amphib recon Marines landing on the western beach of Tsugen Shima. Although they encountered civilians on the beach, they signaled the remainder of the battalion ashore.

While the headquarters company set up the command post, both A and B recon companies continued further inland, with Lt Corey's Company landing just north from Silverthorn. Just inland from the beach, they encountered four Okinawan civilians, capturing two; the other two fled, alerting the nearby Japanese garrison in Tsugen village. Immediately, both ALPHA and BRAVO Company encountered heavy machine-gun and mortar fire. Corey's BRAVO Company encountered heavy resistance from Japanese-dug trench systems.

They suffered two amphib recon Marine casualties, including all the war dogs and handlers accompanying the amphib recon Marines. Major Jones quickly decided to withdraw since they had accomplished their mission in determining enemy presence in the area. Lt. Corey of BRAVO Company directed Marine Sergeant Clarence Fridley to command a five-man squad, of what was considered one of the best within the company; PFCs Nelson Donley, Clarence Krejci, Wiley Saucier and Donald McNees, to cover their withdrawal of the battalion from the beaches. Most of their rubber boats were damaged during mortar attacks and found some unscathed and available. Fridley's squad covered and protected the other amphib recon Marines that were 'over-loading' the dead and eight wounded Marines on the rubber boats. By dawn, they were collectively down on the beach and planned their withdrawal.

Finding no usable rubber boats, the remaining amphib recon Marines swam the few kilometers out to sea where the APDs were waiting, dropping their equipment as they took to deeper waters. Four days later, the Army's 3rd Battalion, 105th Infantry of the 27th Infantry Division landed its force on Tsugen Shima, supported by naval gunfire.

Other islands were explored on following days. The entire FMF Amphib Recon Battalion landed at 0015, April 7, 1945, on Ike Shima, locating only one civilian. Major Jones then deployed both of his companies early on the morning of April 7. ABLE Company reconnoitered Heanza Shima, landing at 0545. Finding it unoccupied, they proceeded across the channel to the south and by 0800, they arrived to Hamahika Shima. Here they discovered fifteen hundred Okinawan civilians. Meantime, BAKER Company landed on adjacent Takabanare Shima, south of Ike Shima at 0530, finding two hundred Okinawan civilians. Later, they both embarked on to their APDs, returning to Major Jones with their reports.

Later that evening at 2230 on April 7, BRAVO Company landed on Kutaka Shima, 8 miles (13 km) south of Ike Shima—the southernmost of the "eastern islands"—through heavy surf. Although no civilians nor Japanese were encountered, three rubber boats were dumped in the heavy surf and one Marine drowned. By 0100, April 8, 1945, they returned to the APD, concluding the last recon mission of the eastern islets in the Okinawa Islands.

Encircling Okinawa, the two APDs repositioned the amphib recon battalion on the northwestern coast of Okinawa, near Motobu Peninsula. Major Jones' FMFPAC Amphib Recon Battalion was tasked in participating in seizing the two islets on the western coast of Okinawa, Ie Shima and Minna Shima – north of Motubu Peninsula. The entire amphib recon battalion landed on Minna Shima at 0445, April 14, 1945. Taking only two hours to cover the whole island, they found no presence of Japanese defenders and only thirty Okinawans.

They returned to their APDs in preparation to cover the beach landings for protecting the UDT's recon in their anticipation of the Army's artillery landing scheduled for April 15. Following the UDT clearing the littoral area for the upcoming main landing party, the Army landed two 105-mm howitzer battalions and one 155-mm howitzer battalion; it provided positive support during the Army's 77th Division landing on Ie Shima scheduled for the 305th and 306th Regiments on April 16. By April 20, 1945, Ie Shima was announced secured.

Major Jones and the entire FMFPAC Amphib Recon Battalion remained on Minna Shima until noon on April 14, when they reembarked their APDs. Three days later, they were detached from the Army's 77th Division joint-occupation operation and reported attached to III Amphibious Corps

Months later in mid-June 1945, the FMFPAC Amphib Recon Battalion coordinated recon missions with the 'organic' scout-recon companies of the 1st and 6th Marine Divisions. These were going to be Jones's battalions' last, final missions during World War II and their necessary preliminary reconnaissance for the ICEBERG operations. On the night of 13 – June 14, BRAVO Company, under Lt. Russell Corey landed on Kume Shima, 55 miles (89 km) west of Naha, finding only civilians and withdrew returning to their ship.

However, later on June 26, 1945, Major Jones's amphib recon battalion of 252 men, and A Company of 1st Battalion, 7th Marine Regiment disembarked from LST-1040 and landed again on Kume Shima, an islet west from offshore Okinawa. They seized and occupied the offshore island, encountering a large number of civilians and a radio relay station operated by 25–30 Japanese soldiers. Simultaneously, Major Tony Walker's 6th Marine Division Recon Company seized the eastern islands in the vicinity offshore from Okinawa.

The recon Marines of the Amphibious Reconnaissance Battalion were awarded for their accomplishments, however the recon Marines were always inadequately commended due to public recognition. Rubber-stamped in very large letters on both top and bottom of the page clearly stated, 'TOP SECRET'.

The Amphibious Reconnaissance Battalion received a commendation from Major General A. D. Bruce of the 77th Infantry Division.

The commendation notes that the battalion joined the Division at Leyte prior to departure for Okinawa Gunto, and Major Jones and his staff participated in the final planning phase for the operation, and that the information obtained during the patrols played a crucial part in the successful operations against Kerama Retto, Keise Shima, and Minna Shima, as well as valuable assistance during the Kerama Retto and Ie Shima operations.

An endorsement personally signed by Lt General Simon Buckner also classified TOP SECRET, noted:

"... I personally followed the excellent performance of the Battalion with much interest and would add that the part played by this splendid organization materially assisted in the success of our present campaign. The close cooperation of the services, Marine and Army, was here exemplified to the highest degree."

In addition, the battalion also received an unclassified commendation signed personally by General Joseph Stilwell, commanding Tenth Army:

"... for your superior performance under the capable leadership of Major James Jones in carrying out your assigned missions in the Ryukyus Campaign. The Fleet Marine Force may well be proud of the development of amphibious reconnaissance as exemplified by your activities. Use of your battalion as the 'only-ground reconnaissance' agency held under Tenth Army Headquarters expedited the accomplishment of all phases of the recent campaign. Your aggressive action made unnecessary the use of large forces in the seizure of the eastern islands of Okinawa, the islands off Motobu Peninsula and Kume Shima."—General Joseph W. Stilwell, Tenth Army to Fleet Marine Force Reconnaissance Battalion.

=== Disbandment ===
Dissolution of the battalion following World War II was quick. The battalion embarked 1 – August 22 on the USS Elkhart, a slow-moving troop transport from Okinawa, formulating plans to invade one of the southern Ryukyu Islands toward mainland Japan. They had progressed as far as Ulithi Atoll in the Caroline Islands when the first atomic bomb was dropped. The Company remained at Ulithi, 23 Aug – 11 Sep, and embarked the President Johnson, arriving at Pearl Harbor September 12. Major Jones was transferred to the continental United States after having served 25 months under combative service, leaving his executive officer, Markovitch, to command the FMFPAC Amphib Recon Battalion.

== Post World War II ==
=== 2nd Amphibious Reconnaissance Battalion ===
Since the deactivation of the 'first' FMFPAC Amphibious Reconnaissance Battalion on September 24, 1945, there was no need for Fleet Marine Force-level reconnaissance between World War II and the Korean War. The only recon units that existed within the Marine Corps, were the Marine Division-level recon companies. After two years of the Korean War, the generals both at Fleet Marine Force, Atlantic and Fleet Marine Force, Pacific recommended to then-Marine Commandant Clifton Cates that the Marine Corps must reactivate the FMF-level reconnaissance capability. The Corps commanders need their own recon assets and should not rely on the already heavily tasked division recon companies.

Major Regan Fuller formed the 2nd Amphib Recon Battalion in December 1950 at Camp Lejeune as commanding officer, including Leo Shinn as the executive officer and Harry C. Minnear became the S-3. With the 3rd Marine Division also reactivated (due to end of World War II), the Marine Corps now had three division-level recon companies and two small force-level amphib recon battalions.

On the West Coast, the reappearance of a specialized reconnaissance unit at Camp Pendleton was promulgated by the motivated Colonel Victor Krulak from G-3 of FMFPac. After Krulak sent a message to the Commanding General of FMFPAC, the Amphibious Reconnaissance Platoon was formed on March 12, 1951. Located initially in the 15-area of Camp Pendleton, the Platoon later moved to the Del Mar area due to proximity to the ocean.

First Lieutenant Francis "Bull" Kraince, who had been one of Houghton's Recon Company lieutenants in Korea, was designated officer in charge, and TSgts Ernest L. DeFazio and John W. Slagel, along with SSgt Neal D. King and Cpl Wiley B. Ballow were the only non-commissioned officers for the 55-man recon platoon. The remainder consisted of a platoon of "boots" directly out of the recruit depots. The platoon at one time or another included the Communications Chief (S-6), Sgt Al Gray and SSgt Dave Twohey, along with five or so more men who subsequently were commissioned Marine Colonels, and TSgt Stan Lamote and Puckett, who retired as a Major and Captain respectively.

=== Reconstruction ===
On 1 April 1953, the platoon was expanded into company size and Kraince was relieved by Major Witt as commanding officer. By October 1953, FMFPAC directed the redesignation of 1st Amphibious Reconnaissance Company, as the 1st Provisional Amphibious Reconnaissance Battalion, remaining under the Fleet Marine Force and further directed deployment of one company to Kaneohe as an element of the 1st Provisional Amphibious Reconnaissance Group. 1st Provisional Amphibious Recon Group was activated on October 14, 1953. Further, the 1st Provisional Recon Group deployed to Marine Corps Air Facility Kaneohe Bay, Territory of Hawaii, on October 19, 1953, for duty with the First Provisional Air-Ground Task Force. Leaving Headquarters and Service and B Companies at Camp Pendleton, A Company remained at Kaneohe Bay. Personnel were to be rotated on a six-month basis.

On January 11, 1954, the Company at Camp Pendleton was redesignated Headquarters and Service Company of 1st Provisional Reconnaissance Battalion. A minor redesignation on August 31, 1954, altered the company's title to Headquarters Section, and six months later, on February 24, 1955, it was redesignated 1st Amphibious Reconnaissance Company and subsequently attached to Headquarters Battalion, 1st Marine Division the following October.

Bobby Joe Patterson, initially an avid diver attached to 1st Combat Service Group's S-3 shop, later became one of the principal developers of submarine lock—in/lock-out gear. His proficiency was such that, like so many subsequent Force Recon Marines, he worked later for the Central Intelligence Agency from 1962 to 1964, relieved by another Force Recon Marine, Sergeant Dossier.

Perhaps the last commanding officer of the 1st Amphibious Reconnaissance Company was Michael M. Spark, known to his peers as "Cycle Michael", who was killed later in Vietnam serving as regimental commander.

=== Marine Corps Test Unit One ===
By the time the two FMF Amphibious Reconnaissance Battalions were in their reconstruction period, Marine Corps Test Unit#1, MCTU#1, was also formed in 1954 for testing methods of mobilizing its Marines in the atomic age. Captain Michael Spark, Commanding Officer of 1st Amphib Recon Company was relieved by Major Bruce F. Meyers. When 1st Amphib Recon Company returned from operation in the Panama Canal aboard the USS Perch (ASSP-313), on June 16, 1957, the re-developed Research and Development, Reconnaissance Platoon from the Marine Corps Test Unit One, became the co-founder of 1st Force Reconnaissance Company, when it molded into the dismantled 1st Amphib Recon Company.

== Missions and training ==
=== Training ===
The Combat Swimming Company was formed before the end of World War II at Marine Corps Base Camp Pendleton as part of a staging regiment to train Marines listed for duty overseas in sea survival, knife and club fighting, and various survival skills. It trained pilots, UDT, and amphibious reconnaissance Marines as replacement personnel for the FMF Amphib Recon Battalion. The Commanding Officer of the Combat Swimming Company, Capt. "Dutch" Smith, had won a gold medal for diving in the 1932 Summer Olympics. It was presented to him by Adolf Hitler.

One of the swimming instructors, Bruce F. Meyers, later became the officer-in-charge of the Troop Training Unit, Pacific of the Amphibious Reconnaissance School, a school established for the Navy UDT and amphib recon Marines, during their process for further training in amphibious reconnaissance in preparation for their first engagements in the Pacific. While Meyers was an instructor, Chesty Puller was the commanding officer of the Troop Training Unit. Meyers became a significant figure in the formation of the modern-FMF-level recon units.

The first major test of amphib recon unit occurred during the Atlantic Fleet Landing Exercise, Number 52, or LANTFLEX 52, a series of training exercises conducted 15–17 November 1951. For this exercise, FMFLANT's Task Force 22 was supported by the 2nd Amphibious Reconnaissance Battalion under direct control of the Commander of Amphibious Troops. One company of the battalion participated during the fall of 1952 aboard the USS Sea Lion (ASSP-315), first in Vieques, then acting as reconnaissance-in-force along the coast of North Carolina of 16–20 October 1952; both on Onslow Beach and an amphib recon mission in the vicinity of Bogue Field, 9–13 November 1952.

During the exercise, the G-3 of FMFLANT ordered the amphib recon unit to conduct a raid. Major Fuller objected that such a mission was not appropriate, but the G-3 stayed confirmed and ordered Fuller to carry out his orders. Later, when Fuller was being confronted by General Erskine, Kenny Houghton, the aide to the General noted that Major Fuller merely followed his orders. Erskine understood; the G-3 gave no more inappropriate missions. It is believed to recon purists that reconnaissance patrols should not be used to augment infantry-ground forces.

During the 1950s, training and employment of recon teams became similar to that of the Division's Recon Company. A recommendation was forwarded on 5 May 1954 by the Commanding General, FMFLANT, to the commanding generals of 2nd Marine Division and Force Troops, FMFLANT, proposing that the 2nd Amphib Recon Company and the Recon Company of 2nd Marine Division conduct similar training and deployments, the division recon company to train from an ASSP for 15 training days during the first and third quarters, the 2nd Amphibious Reconnaissance Company to train in the second and fourth quarters. Both were to be employed as a unit once a year in a LANTFLEX exercise, and both were to dispatch a team of one officer or staff NCO and four to six enlisted to the Naval Forces, Eastern Atlantic and Mediterranean, or NELM Battalion (Reinforced) alternating this commitment.

Marines of the Amphib Recon Platoon, FMFPAC trained until they became adept in rubber boat handling and made practice landings in Guam and Hawaiʻi. The landing exercise, LEX ABLE-1, was held at San Clemente Island in September 1951; together with UDT Team 3, they conducted amphibious reconnaissance training exercises off USS Perch ASSP-313 at Midway and Guam, from 8 October through 3 November 1951. The Platoon also provided instructors to train pilots in escape and evasion tactics and interrogation resistance at March Air Force Base.

Part of their 'practice mission' included conducting raids as well as reconnaissance. During one such exercise, the unit embarked a submarine to "capture" the vital installations at Adak, Alaska, defended by a 1000-man force. Seven days were allotted the amphibious reconnaissance Marines to accomplish their mission. The platoon trained in the Central Pacific in 1952 and the Arctic in early 1953.

The unit embarked on a training program which included participation in a number of small amphibious landing exercises in Southern California such as Operation RAINBOW involving 400 Marines under the command of Major Phillip E. Booth, Commanding Officer of 1st Amphibious Reconnaissance Company.

In early 1956, the company, now commanded by Major Eugenous M. Hovatter, was ordered to Hawaiʻi to train with the 1st Provisional Marine Air-Ground Task Force at Kaneohe Bay, 11 March–25 April. The Company provided a 125-man aggressor force against 8000 Marines for the exercise on the island of Kauaʻi. Success of the former Platoon at Adak was repeated during this operation, in which two objectives were not only reconnoitered but seized as well. The first was immediately captured and the other was taken so swiftly the exercise was repeated to satisfy shocked observing officers. During this exercise the unit was armed with three heavy machine guns, three light machine guns, and nine mortars.

=== Mission statement ===
Raiding was officially part of the reconnaissance mission which was now defined to include: the execution of amphibious reconnaissance missions; and to possess the capability of executing amphibious raids of limited scope. Capture of prisoners, military or civilian for interrogation purposes, contacting secret agents or informants, and the following special operations missions were assigned to the Marines:

1. Limited sabotage or harassment of enemy rear areas accessible by water
2. Minor demonstrations to cause the enemy to disclose his positions
3. Marking of beaches and landing points for the assault wave
4. Reconnoitering the road net and acting as guides for the initial assault waves of the Landing Force
5. Reconnaissance in limited force
6. Small-scale amphibious raids against enemy personnel and lightly defended installations
