= D-Day (military term) =

Day on which a combat attack or operation is to be initiated

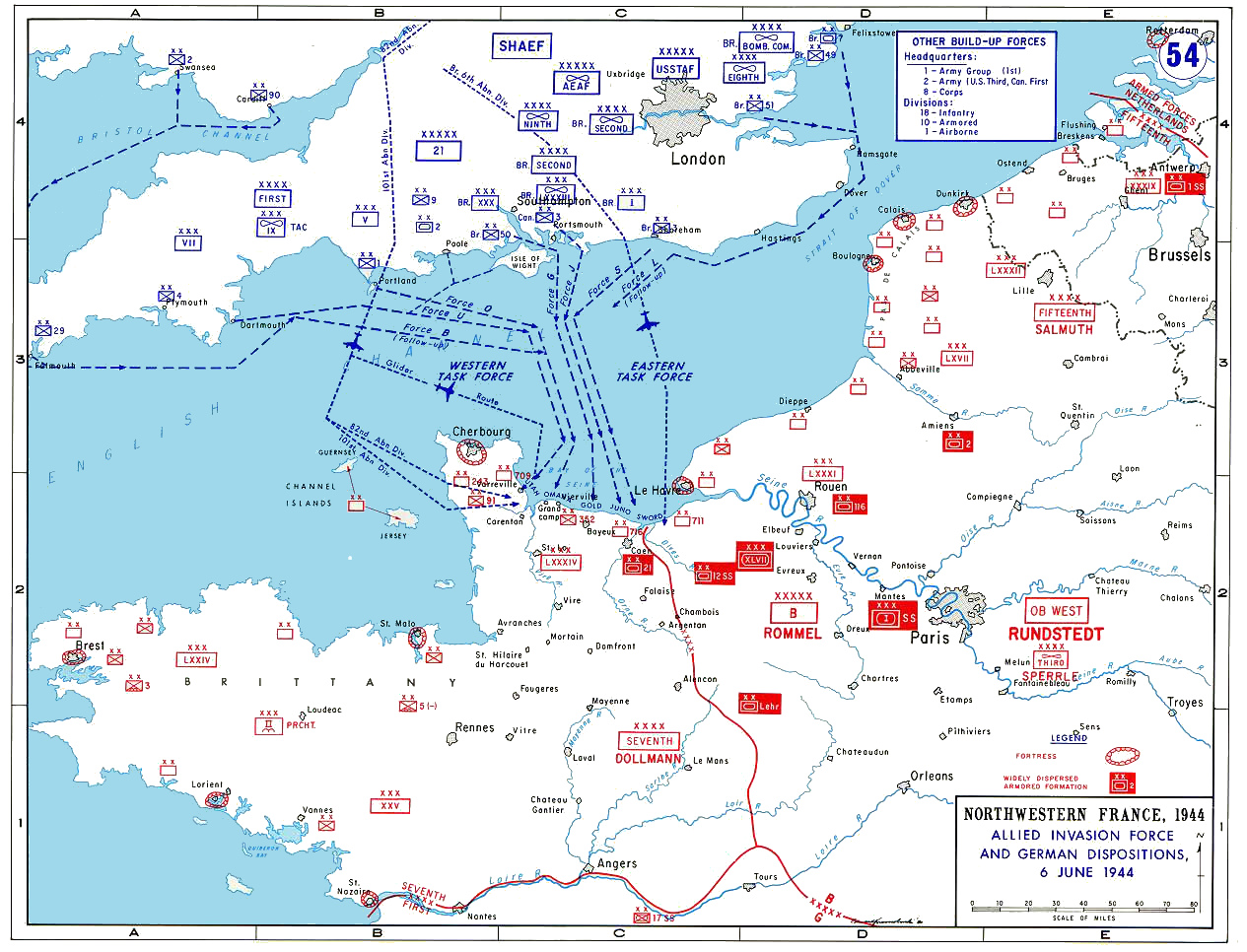
Battle plans for the Normandy Invasion, the most famous D-Day

In the military, D-Day is the day on which a combat attack or operation is to be initiated. The best-known D-Day occurred during World War II on June 6, 1944—the day of the Normandy landings—initiating the Western Allied effort to liberate western Europe from Nazi Germany. However, many other invasions and operations had a designated D-Day, both before and after that operation.

The terms D-Day and H-Hour are used for the day and hour on which a combat attack or operation is to be initiated. They designate the day and hour of the operation when the day and hour have not yet been determined, or where secrecy is essential. For a given operation, the same D-Day and H-Hour apply for all units participating in it. When used in combination with numbers, and plus or minus signs, these terms indicate the point of time following or preceding a specific action, respectively. Thus, H−3 means 3 hours before H-Hour, and D+3 means 3 days after D-Day. (By extension, H+75 minutes is used for H-Hour plus 1 hour and 15 minutes.) Planning papers for large-scale operations are made up in detail long before specific dates are set. Thus, orders are issued for the various steps to be carried out on the D-Day or H-Hour plus or minus a certain number of days, hours, or minutes. At the appropriate time, a subsequent order is issued that states the actual day and times.

Other days such as A-Day (Battle of Leyte), L-Day (Battle of Okinawa) etc. have different meanings for the military.

Other languages have terms equivalent to D-Day such as "Hari H" (Indonesian),Час Ч (Russian), Dagen D or "D-Dagen" (Swedish), Dan D (Serbo-Croatian, Slovene), E eguna (Basque), Jour J (French), Lá L (Irish), Tag X (German), and Ziua-Z (Romanian). The initial D in D-Day has been given various meanings in the past, while more recently it has obtained the connotation of "Day" itself, thereby creating the phrase "Day-Day", or "Day of Days".

== History ==
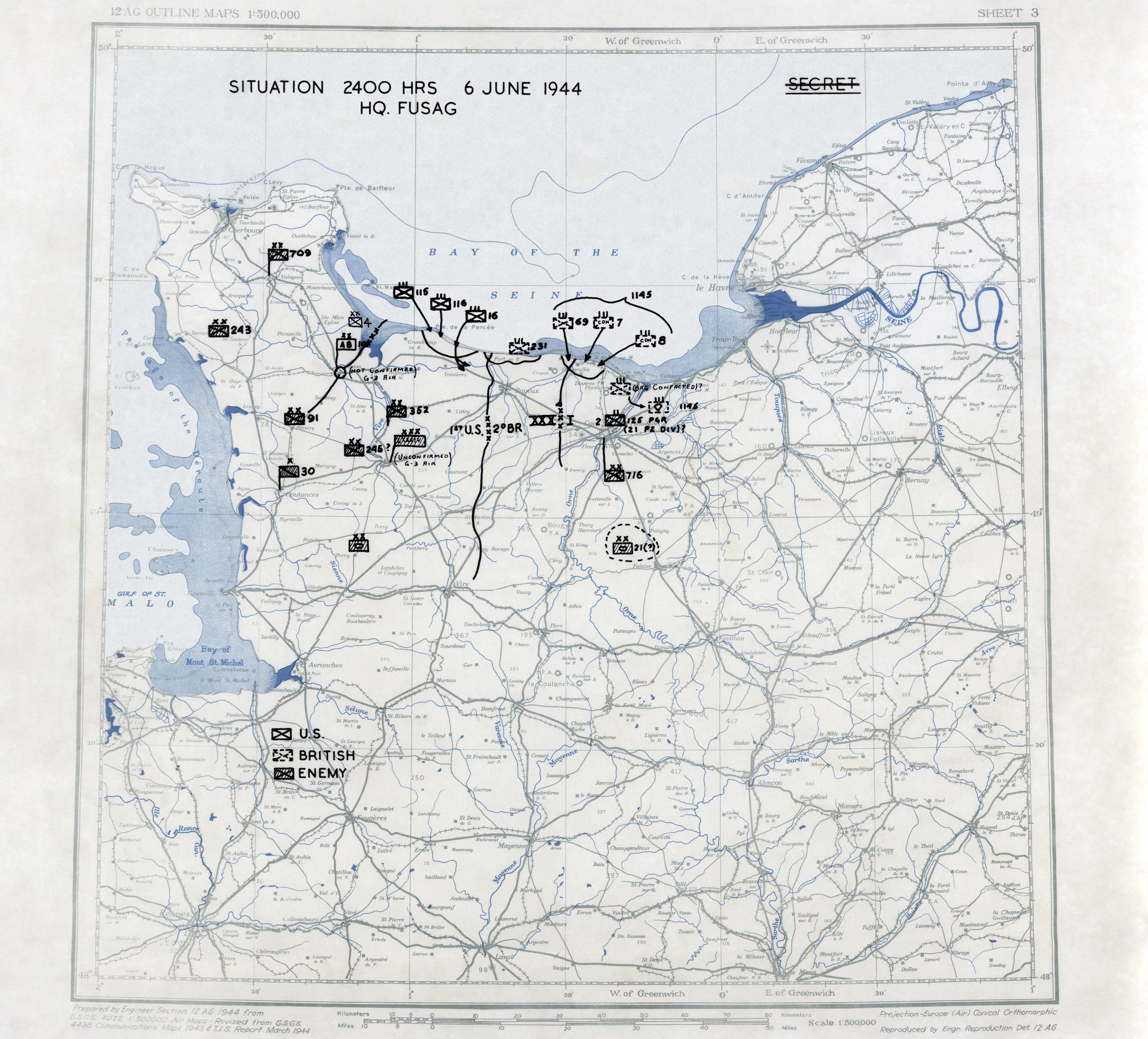
Official U.S. Twelfth Army situation map for 2400 hours, 6 June 1944

The earliest use of the term D-Day by any army that the U.S. Army Center of Military History and the Oxford English Dictionary have been able to find was during World War I: its first recorded use was in Field Order Number 9, First Army, American Expeditionary Forces, dated 7 September 1918: "The First Army will attack at H-Hour on D-Day with the object of forcing the evacuation of St. Mihiel salient."

D-Day for the invasion of Normandy by the Allies was originally set for June 5, 1944, but bad weather and heavy seas caused U.S. Army General Dwight David Eisenhower to delay until June 6 and that date has been popularly referred to ever since by the short title "D-Day". Because of the connotation with the invasion of Normandy, planners of later military operations sometimes avoided the term to prevent confusion. For example, Douglas MacArthur's invasion of Leyte began on "A-Day", and the invasion of Okinawa began on "L-Day". The Allies' proposed invasions of Japan would have begun on "X-Day" (on Kyūshū, scheduled for November 1945) and "Y-Day" (on Honshū, scheduled for March 1946).

== See also ==
- Economic D-Day
