= Toba Waterfall and Arsen Okrojanashvili Cave Natural Monument =

- IUCN category III (natural monument or feature)
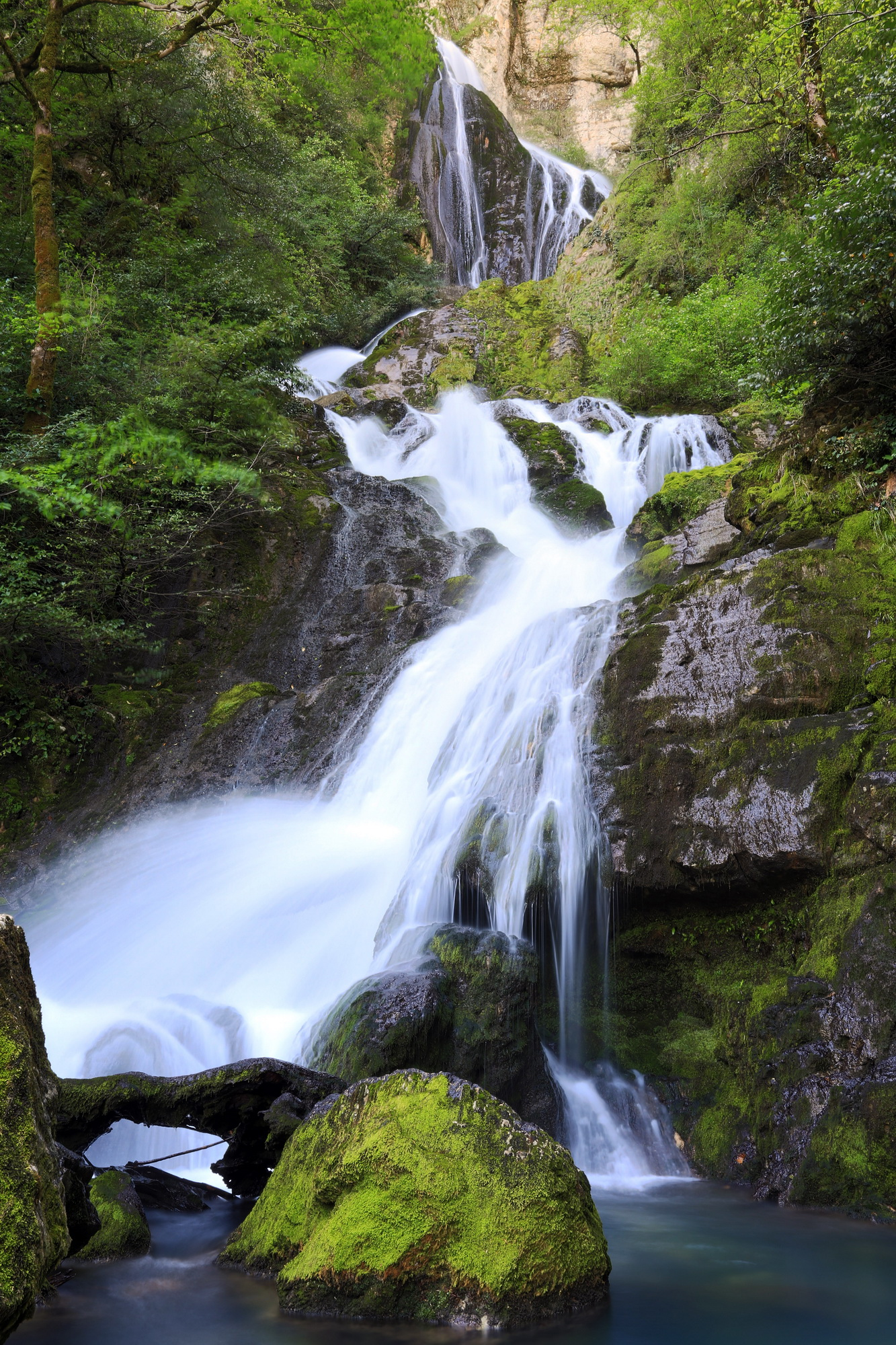
- Toba waterfall

- Location within Georgia Location within Samegrelo-Zemo Svaneti
- Nearest city: Martvili
- Coordinates: 42°28′19.5″N 42°27′18.9″E
- Area: 1.24 km^{2} (0.48 sq mi)
- Established: 2013
- Governing body: Agency of Protected Areas
- Website: ტობის ჩანჩქერისა და არსენ ოქროჯანაშვილის მღვიმის ბუნების ძეგლები

Toba Waterfall and Arsen Okrojanashvili Cave Natural Monument (Georgian: ტობის ჩანჩქერი და არსენ ოქროჯანაშვილის მღვიმე) is the highest in Georgia cascading waterfall of 234 m height and a karst cave complex located 5.6 km to the west from village First Balda (Pirveli Baldi) in Martvili Municipality, Samegrelo-Zemo Svaneti region of Georgia. It is located at 707 metres above sea level on the left bank of Toba river, left-bank tributary of Abasha river and can be reached by marked hiking trail.

== Morphology ==
The Natural Monument Complex is a combination of the Toba Cascading Waterfall and Arsen Okrojanashvili Cave also known as Toba II Cave. The cave formed in limestones can be accessed using small inflatable boat and is difficult to access by foot. The total length of the cave is 1300 m. The entrance measured 15 meters in height by 20 meters in width opens along the canyon path. Cave has several levels and numerous pathways. Several prominent halls in the cave are named: "Nona Hall", "Nana Hall", "Salon", "University 50", "Tbian" and so on. Cave speleothems formed in a variety of shapes. One of the prominent stalagmites reaches 7 meters in height. Water flow in the cave forms four lakes underground and finally, coming out of the cave, produces cascading Toba Waterfall of 234 m height.

== See also ==
- Oniore Waterfall and Toba First Cave Natural Monuments
