= William K. Jones =

United States Marine Corps general

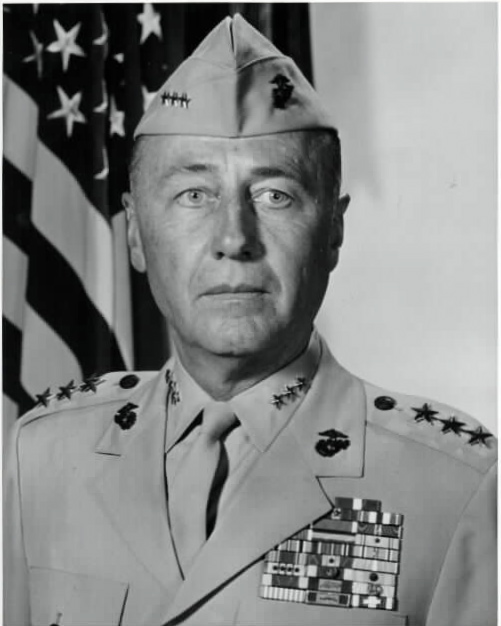
- Born: William Kenefick Jones; October 23, 1916; Joplin, Missouri, U.S.
- Died: April 15, 1998 (aged 81); Alexandria, Virginia, U.S.
- Burial place: Arlington National Cemetery
- Relatives: James L. Jones Sr. (brother); James L. Jones Jr. (nephew)
- Military career
- Branch: United States Marine Corps
- Service years: 1936–1972
- Rank: Lieutenant general
- Nickname: Willie K
- Unit: 1st Battalion 6th Marines
- Commands: 1st Battalion 6th Marines; 1st Marine Regiment; The Basic School; Recruit Training Regiment, MCRD Parris Island; 3rd Marine Division; I Marine Expeditionary Force; Task Force 79, U.S. Seventh Fleet; Fleet Marine Force, Pacific
- Conflicts: World War II Battle of Guadalcanal Battle of Tarawa Battle of Saipan Battle of Tinian Battle of Okinawa; Korean War; Vietnam War
- Awards: Navy Cross; Navy Distinguished Service Medal (3); Silver Star; Legion of Merit; Bronze Star; Purple Heart

William Kenefick Jones (October 23, 1916 – April 15, 1998) was a United States Marine Corps lieutenant general and a highly decorated veteran of three wars. His distinguished career included service as a battalion commander in World War II, regimental commander following the Korean War, and division commander during the Vietnam War. Jones was awarded the Navy Cross, Silver Star, Bronze Star, and Purple Heart for his valor. His final assignment was as commander of the Fleet Marine Force, Pacific. He retired in 1972 after 33 years of active duty.

== Biography ==
William Kenefick Jones was born on October 23, 1916, in Joplin, Missouri. He was raised in Kansas City, Missouri, where he graduated from Southwest High School in 1933. In 1936, while in college, he joined the U.S. Marine Corps Reserves, attending the Platoon Leaders' Class in San Diego, California, during the summers. He graduated with a bachelor's degree in 1937 from the University of Kansas.

=== Early Marine Corps career ===
Jones was commissioned a Reserve second lieutenant on January 31, 1938; was called to active duty on September 29, 1939. He completed the Reserve Officers' Course at Quantico, Virginia, in November 1939; then joined the 1st Battalion, 6th Marines. He remained with the 1st Battalion for almost six years, including all of World War II. In November 1940, he was integrated into the regular Marine Corps.

In May 1941, he deployed with the 6th Marines for Iceland as part of the 1st Marine Brigade. He returned to the United States in March 1942. In Spring 1942, he was promoted to first lieutenant and, shortly after, to captain.

=== World War II ===
In October 1942, he deployed to the Pacific theater with the 1/6. He was a company executive officer (XO) with the 1/6 when he participated in the Battle of Guadalcanal. He then served as a company commander and the 1/6 XO. He was promoted to major in May 1943.

In September 1943, he took command of the 1st Battalion, becoming the youngest commander of a Marine battalion. During the Battle of Tarawa, the 1/6 under the then-Major Jones, "engaged more of the enemy in hand-to-hand combat on Betio than any other unit".

During rehearsals for the Tarawa landing, the 1st Battalion practiced landing from rubber boats, thus earning Jones the title of "Admiral of the Condom Fleet." For the actual landing, 1/6 Marines were carried toward their assigned beach by LCVP landing craft towing their rubber boats. At the reef line, they transferred to the rubber boats and began a 1,000-yard paddle to Green Beach. Once ashore, Jones' Marines began a drive down the island under heavy enemy fire.

He earned a Silver Star and a field promotion to lieutenant colonel for his "gallantry in action" in November 1943 at Tarawa. His citation reads in part:

...he exposed himself to withering shellfire to organize and direct a mortar platoon and elements of his headquarters company in a brilliantly executed counterattack against Japanese troops who had broken through his battalion's lines.

He fought with valor in Battle of Saipan, for which he received the Navy Cross. His citation reads:

...when companies under his command landed out of position on three separate beaches, LtCol. Jones braved heavy enemy mortar, artillery and small-arms fire to proceed from unit to unit and reorganize and direct their disposition in seizing the designated target. Under his competent leadership, the battalion repeatedly turned back Japanese counterattacks during the ensuing two days and, on the night of June 16, bore the brunt of a hostile tank attack in which 24 Japanese tanks were destroyed...

After Tarawa, he fought at Tinian and Okinawa.

=== 1945 to 1952 ===
Jones returned to the States in July 1945 and was assigned to head the Tactics and Techniques Section, of The Basic School. Then from May 1947 until June 1948, he served as the Chief of the Infantry Section, Junior School. He then served briefly in Washington, D.C. During this period, after the war, Jones authored, under the pseudonym "Base Plate McGurk", a series of articles providing advice to young officers. The articles were published in the Marine Corps Gazette, then compiled in a book and published by the Gazette in 1948.

From August 1948 to August 1950 he served in Sweden as assistant naval attaché for air at the American Embassy in Stockholm.

From August 1950 until February 1952, Jones served as head of the Operations Subsection in the G-3 Section, Division of Plans and Policies, Headquarters Marine Corps. In February 1952, he became head of the Operations and Training Branch. He was promoted in rank to colonel in August 1952. From June 1953 to September 1953, he served as assistant G-3 at Headquarters Marine Corps.

=== Korean War ===
In September 1953, Jones moved to Korea to serve as assistant chief of staff, G-3, 1st Marine Division. In February 1954, he took command of the 1st Marine Regiment, 1st Marine Division – which post he held until his returning to the States in July 1954. For his service in Korea he was awarded the Bronze Star.

=== 1954 to 1964 ===
From 1954 to 1958, Jones was stationed at Marine Corps Schools, Quantico. From 1954 to 1956, served as assistant chief of staff, G-2/G-3. From August 1956 to July 1958, Jones was commanding officer of The Basic School, also serving as a member of the Fleet Marine Force Organization and Composition Board from June 1956 to January 1957.

In July 1958, Jones assumed command of the Recruit Training Regiment, Marine Corps Recruit Depot Parris Island, South Carolina. He held this command until July 1960 when he entered the Naval War College in Newport, Rhode Island. Upon completing the course in Naval Warfare, he was assigned to the Pentagon as Chief, General Operations Division, J-3, Operations Directorate, Joint Staff, Office of the Joint Chiefs of Staff, in July 1961. He served in this capacity until September 1962, when he was assigned to Headquarters Marine Corps. On October 1, 1962, he was promoted to brigadier general and appointed legislative assistant to the Commandant of the Marine Corps, General David Shoup.

In March 1964, General Jones assumed command of Force Troops, Fleet Marine Force, Pacific, and Marine Corps Base, Twentynine Palms, California.

=== Vietnam War ===
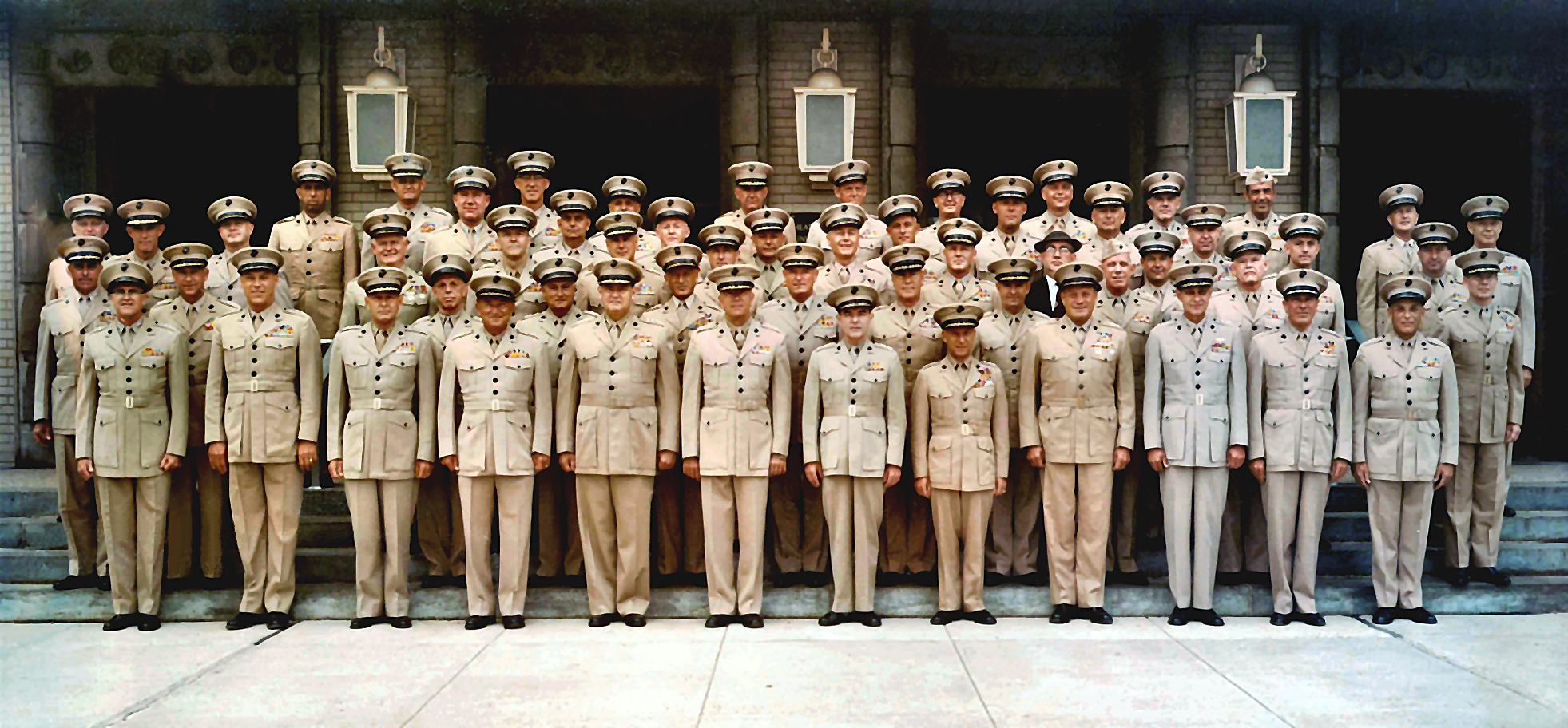
Jones (6th from left, middle row) at the 1967 General Officers Symposium

Jones served with distinction in two combat tours of duty during the Vietnam War. He was sent to South Vietnam in December 1965, serving as director, Combat Operations Center, Headquarters, U.S. Military Assistance Command, Vietnam in Saigon. For services during this tour, he was awarded the Distinguished Service Medal. He was promoted to major general in November 1966. He returned the States in December.

From January 1, 1967, to March 1, 1969, he served as deputy director of personnel, Headquarters Marine Corps. For his service during this time, he was awarded the Legion of Merit.

He returned to Vietnam in April 1969, taking command of the 3rd Marine Division. The division conducted extensive combat operation near the DMZ from April to November of that year. In November 1969, the 3rd Marine Division was redeployed to Okinawa, Japan. While in Japan, in addition to command of the division, Jones became the commanding general of the I Marine Expeditionary Force and commander, Task Force 79 of the U.S. Seventh Fleet.

For exceptionally meritorious service from April 1969 to April 1970, as commanding general of the 3rd Marine Division in Vietnam and as commanding general of I MEF on Okinawa, he was awarded a Gold Star in lieu of a second Distinguished Service Medal. He was also decorated by the government of South Vietnam, being awarded the National Order of Vietnam, 4th Class, the Vietnam Cross of Gallantry, and the Chuong My-1st Class Medal.

=== Final command ===
He returned to the United States in May 1970 as special assistant to the chief of staff at Headquarters Marine Corps. His nomination for three-star rank was confirmed by the U.S. Senate on May 12, 1970, with promotion effective on July 1, 1970.

On July 1, 1970, he assumed his last duty assignment as commanding general, Fleet Marine Force, Pacific, when he relieved LtGen Henry W. Buse Jr. and served in this capacity until his retirement from active duty on September 1, 1972. He was awarded a third award of the Distinguished Service Medal for his service during this assignment.

=== In retirement ===
Jones retired from active duty in 1972, and moved to Alexandria, Virginia. In retirement, he served on the board of directors of the Naval War College.

In 1987, Jones penned the book A Brief History of the 6th Marines, published by the Marine Corps' History and Museums Division.

LtGen Jones died on April 15, 1998, in Alexandria, Virginia, of a stroke. He was buried with full military honors in Arlington National Cemetery. He was survived by his wife, Charlotte Jones, a daughter, and two sons. His son, Hugh M. Jones, preceded him in death in 1965.

== Awards and decorations ==
A complete list of LtGen Jones' medals and decorations include:

Navy Cross		Navy Distinguished Service Medal w/ 2 award stars	Silver Star
Legion of Merit	Bronze Star	Purple Heart	Navy Presidential Unit Citation
American Defense Service Medal	American Campaign Medal	European-African-Middle Eastern Campaign Medal	Asiatic-Pacific Campaign Medal w/ 5 service stars
World War II Victory Medal	National Defense Service Medal w/ 1 service star	Korean Service Medal	Vietnam Service Medal w/ 4 service stars
Order of Military Merit, Eulji Cordon Medal	National Order of Vietnam, Officer	National Order of Vietnam, Knight	Vietnam Gallantry Cross w/ palm
Vietnam Chuong-My Medal, 1st Class	Vietnam Gallantry Cross unit citation	United Nations Korea Medal	Vietnam Campaign Medal

== Family ==
William K. Jones was the brother of James L. Jones Sr. and the uncle of General James L. Jones Jr., the 32nd Commandant of the Marine Corps. His son Charles Jones is a journalist and the author of Boys of '67, which tells the story of three Marines who completed the Basic School in 1967 – Major General Ray Smith, Lieutenant General Martin Steele, and his first cousin General James L. Jones Jr. William K. Jones was also the father of Carol Jones Hatton, LtCol William K. Jones Jr., and another son, Hugh M. Jones, who died in 1965. He was the grandfather of ten grandchildren.

== See also ==
- James L. Jones Sr., brother
- James L. Jones Jr., nephew
