= James L. Jones =

Retired US Marine Corps general and National Security Advisor

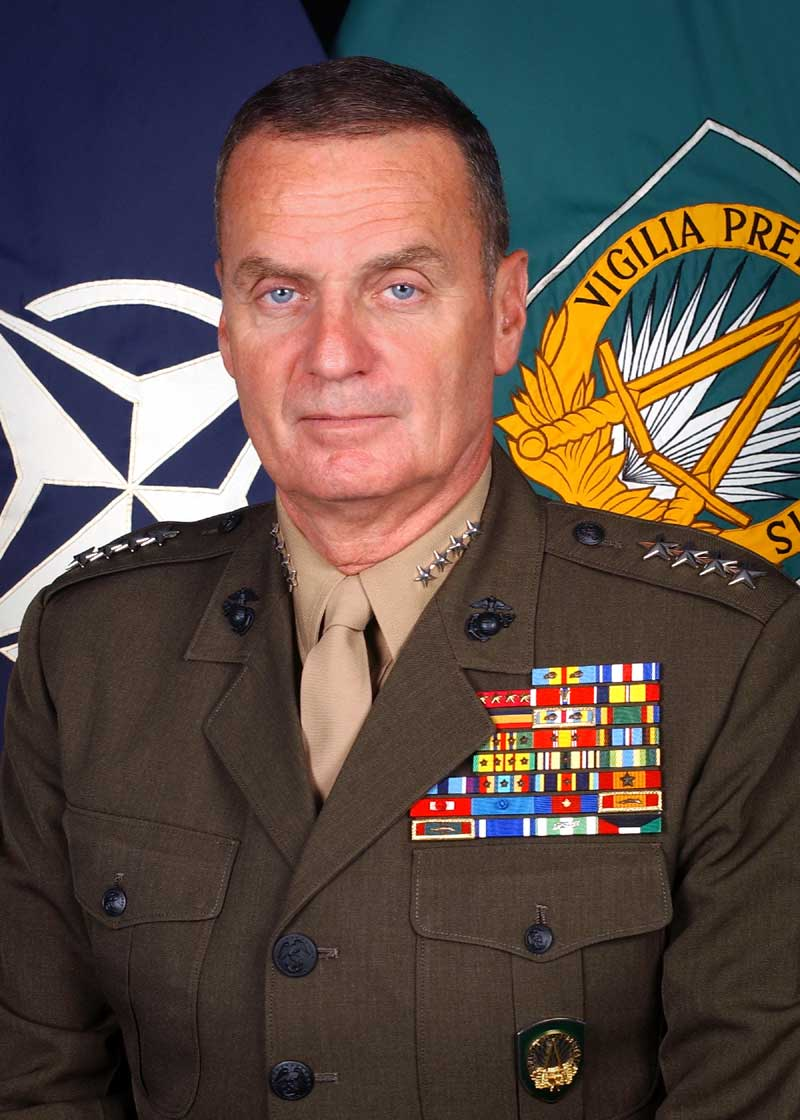
- Official portrait, 2005

21st United States National Security Advisor
- In office January 20, 2009 – October 8, 2010
- President: Barack Obama
- Deputy: Thomas E. Donilon
- Preceded by: Stephen Hadley
- Succeeded by: Thomas E. Donilon

14th Supreme Allied Commander Europe
- In office January 17, 2003 – December 7, 2006
- Secretary General: George Robertson; Alessandro Minuto-Rizzo (acting); Jaap de Hoop Scheffer
- Preceded by: Joseph Ralston
- Succeeded by: Bantz J. Craddock

32nd Commandant of the Marine Corps
- In office July 1, 1999 – January 12, 2003
- President: Bill Clinton; George W. Bush
- Preceded by: Charles C. Krulak
- Succeeded by: Michael Hagee

Personal details
- Born: James Logan Jones Jr. December 19, 1943 (age 82) Kansas City, Missouri, U.S.
- Relatives: James L. Jones Sr. (father); William K. Jones (uncle)
- Education: Georgetown University (BS)

Military service
- Allegiance: United States
- Branch/service: United States Marine Corps
- Years of service: 1967–2007
- Rank: General
- Commands: Supreme Headquarters Allied Powers Europe; United States European Command; Commandant of the Marine Corps; 2nd Marine Division; 24th Marine Expeditionary Unit; 3rd Battalion, 9th Marines
- Battles/wars: Vietnam War; Gulf War
- Awards: Defense Distinguished Service Medal (4); Silver Star; Legion of Merit (5); Bronze Star Medal (with "V" Device); Complete list

James Logan Jones Jr. (born December 19, 1943) is a retired United States Marine Corps four-star general and consultant who served as the 21st United States national security advisor from 2009 to 2010. During his military career, he served as the 32nd commandant of the Marine Corps from July 1999 to January 2003, and commander, United States European Command and Supreme Allied Commander Europe from 2003 to 2006. Jones retired from the Marine Corps on February 1, 2007, after 40 years of service.

After retiring from the Marine Corps, Jones remained involved in national security and foreign policy issues. In 2007, Jones served as chairman of the Congressional Independent Commission on the Security Forces of Iraq, which investigated the capabilities of the Iraqi police and armed forces. In November 2007, he was appointed by the U.S. secretary of state as special envoy for Middle East security. He served as chairman of the Atlantic Council from June 2007 to January 2009, when he assumed the post of National Security Advisor which he held until resigning in November 2010.

Jones owns the consulting firms Ironhand Security LLC and Jones Group International LLC.

== Early life and education ==
Jones was born in Kansas City, Missouri, on December 19, 1943. He is the son of Charlotte Ann (née Ground) and James L. Jones Sr., a decorated Marine in World War II who was an officer in the Observer Group and the commanding officer of its successor, the Amphibious Reconnaissance Battalion. Having spent his formative years in France, where he attended the American School of Paris, he returned to the United States, graduating from Groveton High School in Fairfax County, Virginia, then attended Georgetown University Edmund A. Walsh School of Foreign Service, from which he received a Bachelor of Science degree in 1966. Jones, who is six feet four inches (1.93 m) tall, played forward on the 1963–64 Georgetown Hoyas men's basketball team.

== Military career ==
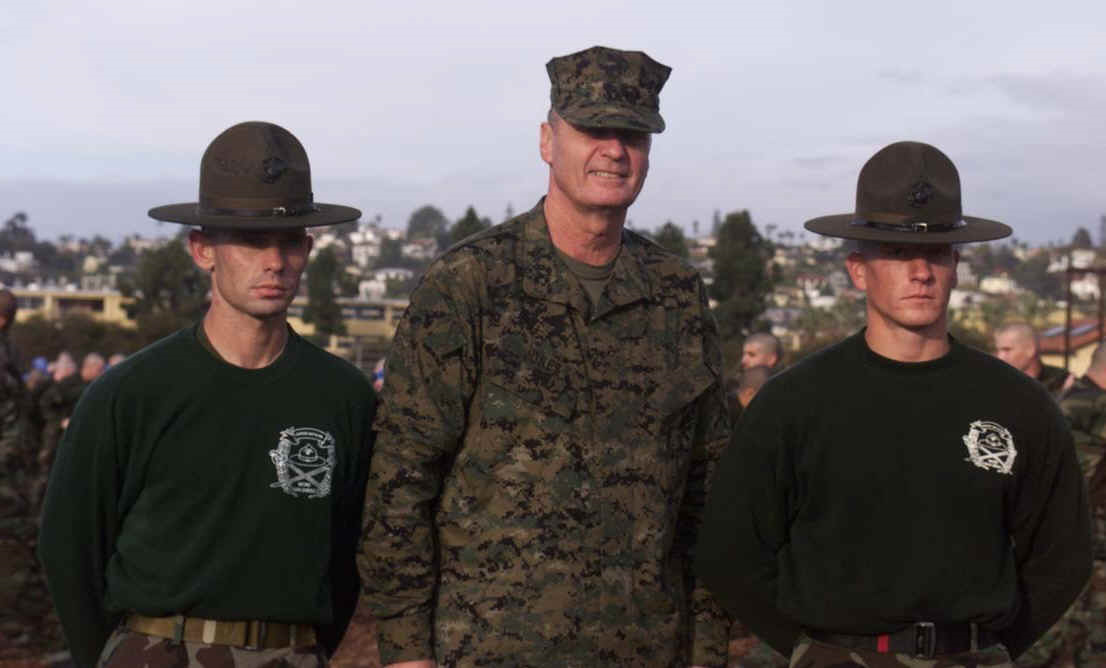
Jones visits Marine Corps Recruit Depot San Diego in January 2002, wearing an early version of the Marine Corps Combat Utility Uniform in woodland MARPAT

In January 1967, Jones was commissioned a second lieutenant in the United States Marine Corps. Upon completion of The Basic School at Marine Corps Base Quantico, Virginia, in October 1967, he was ordered to South Vietnam, where he served as a platoon and company commander with Golf Company, 2nd Battalion, 3rd Marines. While overseas, he was promoted to first lieutenant in June 1968.

Returning to the United States in December 1968, Jones was assigned to Marine Corps Base Camp Pendleton, California, where he served as a company commander until May 1970. He then received orders to Marine Barracks, Washington, D.C., for duties as a company commander, serving in this assignment until July 1973. While at this post, he was promoted to captain in December 1970. From July 1973 until June 1974, he was a student at the Amphibious Warfare School, Marine Corps University, Marine Corps Base Quantico, Virginia.

In November 1974, Jones received orders to report to the 3rd Marine Division at Marine Corps Base Camp Smedley D. Butler, Okinawa, Japan, where he served as the commander of Company H, 2nd Battalion, 9th Marines, until December 1975.

From January 1976 to August 1979, Jones served in the Officer Assignments Section at Headquarters Marine Corps, Washington, D.C. During this assignment, he was promoted to major in July 1977. Remaining in Washington, his next assignment was as the Marine Corps liaison officer to the United States Senate, where he served until July 1984. In this assignment, his first commander was John McCain, then a United States Navy captain. He was promoted to lieutenant colonel in September 1982.

=== Senior staff and command ===
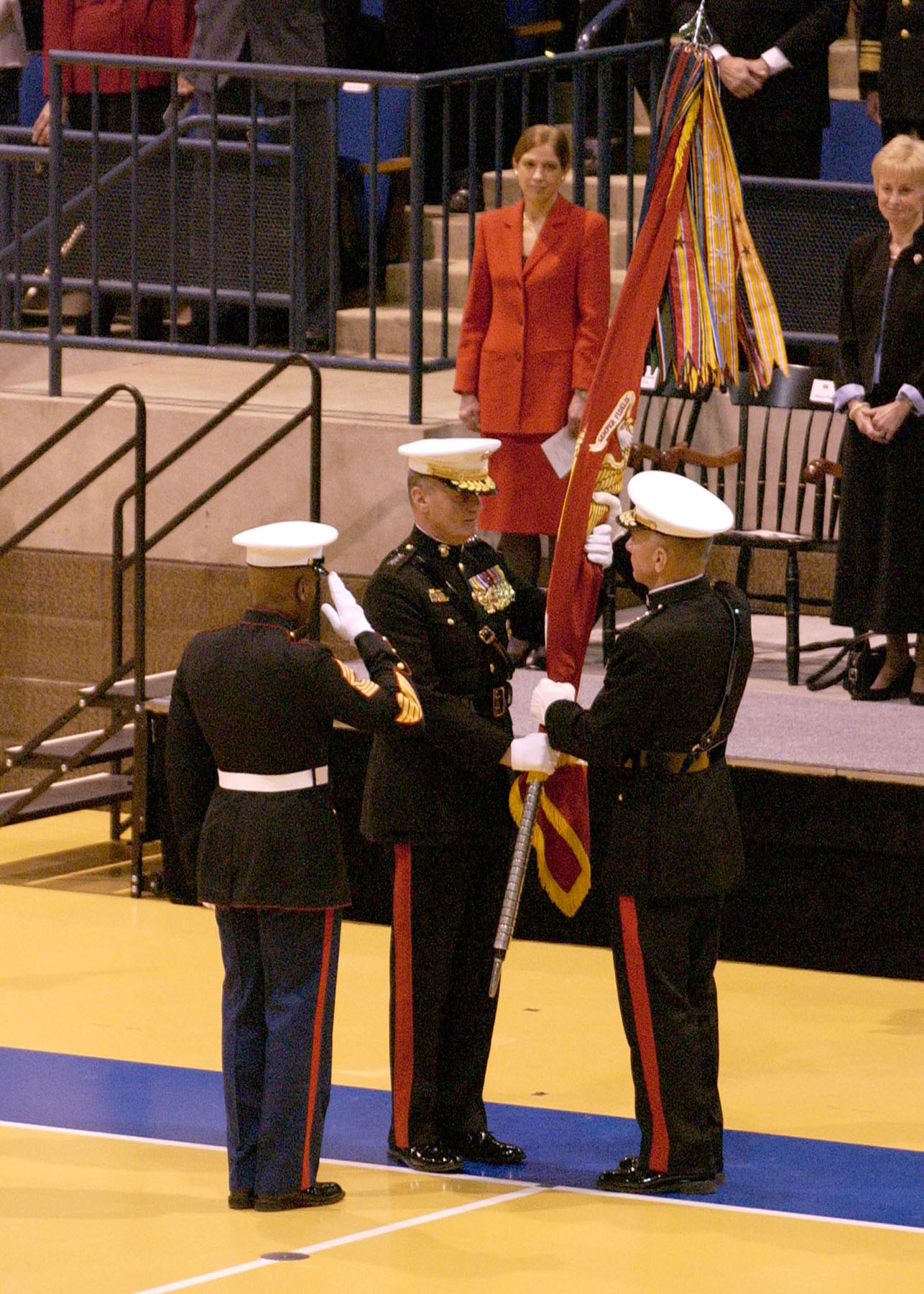
Change of Command ceremony, January 13, 2003. SgtMajMC Alford McMichael (left) salutes as General Jones (center) relinquishes command to General Michael Hagee (right)

Jones was selected to attend the National War College in Washington, D.C. Following graduation in June 1985, he was assigned to command the 3rd Battalion, 9th Marines, 1st Marine Division, at Camp Pendleton, California, from July 1985 to July 1987.

In August 1987, Jones returned to Headquarters Marine Corps, where he served as senior aide to the Commandant of the Marine Corps. He was promoted to colonel in April 1988, and became the Military Secretary to the Commandant of the Marine Corps in February 1989. During August 1990, Jones was assigned as the commanding officer of the 24th Marine Expeditionary Unit (24th MEU) at Marine Corps Base Camp Lejeune, North Carolina.

During his tour with the 24th MEU, Jones participated in Operation Provide Comfort in Northern Iraq and Turkey. He was advanced to brigadier general on April 23, 1992. Jones was assigned to duties as deputy director, J-3, United States European Command in Stuttgart, Germany, on July 15, 1992. During this tour of duty, he was reassigned as chief of staff, Joint Task Force Provide Promise, for operations in Bosnia and Herzegovina and North Macedonia.

Returning to the United States, Jones was advanced to the rank of major general in July 1994 and was assigned as commanding general, 2nd Marine Division, Marine Forces Atlantic, Marine Corps Base Camp Lejeune. Jones next served as director, Expeditionary Warfare Division (N85), Office of the Chief of Naval Operations, during 1996, then as the deputy chief of staff for plans, policies, and operations, Headquarters Marine Corps, Washington, D.C. He was advanced to lieutenant general on July 18, 1996. His next assignment was as the military assistant to the Secretary of Defense.

=== Commandant ===
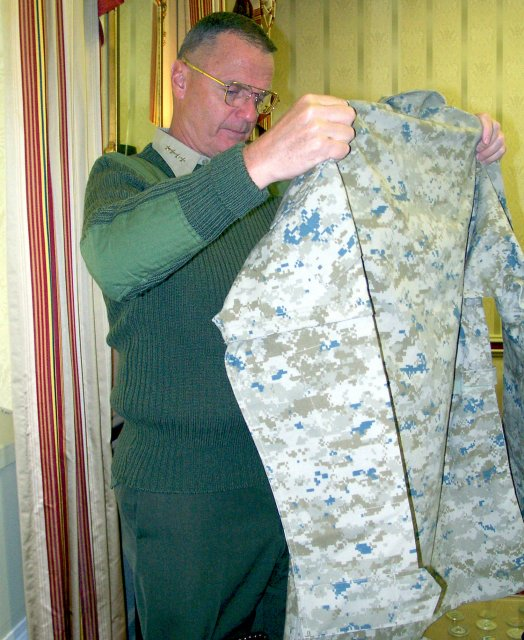
Jones examines an early MCCUU/MARPAT prototype during its testing phases

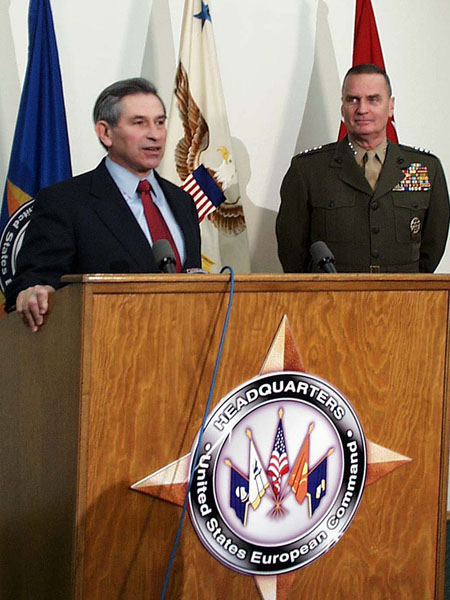
Deputy Defense Secretary Paul D. Wolfowitz and Jones at press conference announcing Jones as EUCOM Commander

On April 21, 1999, Jones was nominated for appointment to the grade of general and assignment as the 32nd Commandant of the Marine Corps. He was promoted to general on June 30, 1999, and assumed the post on July 1, 1999. He served as commandant until January 2003, turning over the reins to General Michael Hagee.

Among other innovations during his tenure as Marine Corps commandant, Jones oversaw the Marine Corps' development of MARPAT camouflage uniforms, and the adoption of the Marine Corps Martial Arts Program. These replaced M81 Woodland uniforms and the LINE combat system, respectively.

=== Supreme Allied Commander Europe ===
Jones assumed duties as the commander of United States European Command (EUCOM) on January 16, 2003, and Supreme Allied Commander Europe (SACEUR) the following day. He was the first Marine Corps general to serve as SACEUR/EUCOM commander.

The Marine Corps had only recently begun to take on a larger share of high-level assignments in the Department of Defense. In December 2006, Jones was one of five serving Marine Corps four-star general officers who outranked the Commandant of the Marine Corps, General James T. Conway in terms of seniority and time in grade—the others being Chairman of the Joint Chiefs of Staff General Peter Pace; former commandant General Michael Hagee; commander of United States Strategic Command General James E. Cartwright; and Assistant Commandant General Robert Magnus.

As SACEUR, Jones led the Allied Command Operations (ACO), comprising NATO's military forces in Europe, from the Supreme Headquarters Allied Powers Europe in Mons, Belgium. Jones relinquished command as SACEUR on December 7, 2006, and was succeeded by United States Army General John Craddock. Jones was reported to have declined an opportunity to succeed General John P. Abizaid as commander of United States Central Command. He retired from the Marine Corps on February 1, 2007.

=== Awards and decorations ===
Jones' personal decorations include (foreign and non-U.S. personal and unit decorations are in order of precedence based on military guidelines and award date):

| Row 1 | Defense Distinguished Service Medal w/ 3 bronze oak leaf clusters | | | |
| Row 2 | Silver Star | Legion of Merit w/ 4 award stars | Bronze Star w/ valor device | Combat Action Ribbon |
| Row 3 | Navy Presidential Unit Citation | Joint Meritorious Unit Award w/ 2 oak leaf clusters | Navy Unit Commendation | Navy Meritorious Unit Commendation w/ 4 service stars |
| Row 4 | National Intelligence Distinguished Service Medal | National Defense Service Medal w/ 2 service stars | Armed Forces Expeditionary Medal | Vietnam Service Medal w/ 4 service stars |
| Row 5 | Southwest Asia Service Medal w/ 1 service star | Armed Forces Service Medal | Humanitarian Service Medal | Navy Sea Service Deployment Ribbon w/ 3 service stars |
| Row 6 | Navy & Marine Corps Overseas Service Ribbon w/ 1 service star | Vietnam Gallantry Cross w/ bronze star | Legion of Honor Commander | National Order of Merit Officier |
| Row 7 | Meritorious Service Cross, post-nominal: M.S.C. | Military Order of Italy, Commander | Order of the Cross of the Eagle, 1st Class | Order of the Lithuanian Grand Duke Gediminas, Commander's Grand Cross |
| Row 8 | Military Order of Aviz, Grand Cross | Great Merit Cross - Grand Cross - Great Cross with Star and Sash | Vietnam Gallantry Cross unit citation | Vietnam Civil Actions unit citation |
| Row 9 | NATO Meritorious Service Medal | NATO Medal for Former Yugoslavia | Vietnam Campaign Medal | Kuwait Liberation Medal (Kuwait) |
United States European Command Badge

=== Silver Star citation ===
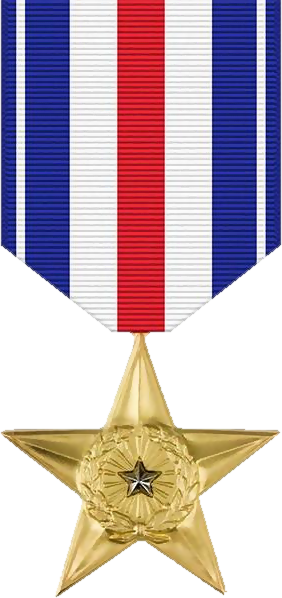

The President of the United States of America takes pleasure in presenting the Silver Star to First Lieutenant James Logan Jones, Jr. (MCSN: 0-102030), United States Marine Corps Reserve, for conspicuous gallantry and intrepidity in action while serving as Commanding Officer of Company F, Second Battalion, Third Marines, THIRD Marine Division, in connection with operations against the enemy in the Republic of Vietnam. On the night of 27 May 1968, while occupying a defensive position near Khe Sanh, Company F, came under heavy attack by a numerically superior North Vietnamese Army force. During the ensuing fire fight, the company defensive perimeter was penetrated by enemy. Realizing the seriousness of the situation, First Lieutenant Jones unhesitatingly exposed himself to intense fire and fearlessly maneuvered across the fire-swept terrain while rapidly readjusting his defensive lines. Ignoring the enemy rockets and hand grenades impacting around him, he boldly directed supporting artillery fire on his position to halt the hostile force's attack. Continuing his determined efforts, he directed the delivery of accurate suppressive fire which repulsed numerous enemy attacks during the remainder of the night. His heroic actions and outstanding leadership inspired all who served with him and were instrumental in his unit accounting for 230 North Vietnamese soldiers confirmed killed. By his courage, aggressive fighting spirit and unwavering devotion to duty in the face of great personal danger, First Lieutenant Jones upheld the highest traditions of the Marine Corps and of the United States Naval Service.

==== Other recognition ====
In 2000, Jones received the Golden Plate Award of the American Academy of Achievement.

== Post-military career ==
=== Business roles ===
Following his retirement from the military, Jones became president of the Institute for 21st Century Energy, an affiliate of the US Chamber of Commerce; he also served as chair of the board of directors of the Atlantic Council of the United States from June 2007 until January 2009, when he assumed the post of National Security Advisor. Jones also served as a member of the guiding coalition for the Project on National Security Reform, as well as chairman of the Independent Commission on the Iraqi Security Forces. He was a member of the board of directors of The Boeing Company from June 21, 2007, to December 15, 2008, serving on the company's Audit and Finance Committees. Jones was also a member of the board of directors of Cross Match Technologies, a privately held biometric solutions company, from October 2007 to January 2009.

Jones was employed on the board of trustees of the Center for Strategic and International Studies (CSIS), a bipartisan think-tank, from 2007 to 2008, and then began serving again in 2011. He was a member of the board of directors of Chevron Corporation from May 28, 2008, to December 5, 2008, serving on the Board Nominating and Governance and Public Policy Committees. According to the first report since Jones re-entered government service in January 2009, Jones earned a salary and bonus of $900,000 from the US Chamber, as well as director fees of $330,000 from the Boeing Company and $290,000 from the Chevron Corporation.

After leaving the Obama administration, Jones returned as a Fellow at the US Chamber in 2011.

The board of directors of General Dynamics has elected Jones to be a director of the corporation, effective August 3, 2011. Also, on January 13, 2012, Jones joined Deloitte Consulting LLP as a senior adviser who will work with Federal and commercial consulting clients within Deloitte's Department of Defense and Intel segments. In early 2013, Jones joined OxiCool Inc's Advisory Board.

Jones established the consulting firms Ironhand Security LLC and Jones Group International LLC. The firms have worked for foreign governments, including Saudi Arabia. After the murder of Jamal Khashoggi by the Saudi regime, Jones downplayed his firms' work with the Saudi government and said that the remaining contract with them was about to expire. However, Jones's firms subsequently expanded its partnership with the Saudi regime. By 2022, his firms had four contracts with the Saudi government and employed 53 Americans in Riyadh, eight of whom were retired generals and admirals.

=== Diplomatic roles ===
Secretary of State Condoleezza Rice asked Jones twice to be Deputy Secretary of State after Robert Zoellick resigned. He declined.

On May 25, 2007, Congress created an Independent Commission on the Security Forces of Iraq to investigate for 120 days the capabilities of the Iraq armed forces and police. Jones served as chairman of that commission and reported on Congress on September 6, 2007, noting serious deficiencies in the Iraq Interior Ministry and in the Iraq National Police.

Rice appointed Jones as a special envoy for Middle East security on November 28, 2007, to work with both Israelis and Palestinians on security issues.

Jones serves as a Senior Fellow at the Bipartisan Policy Center (BPC), where he works on a variety of national security and energy-related issues. Jones is also a co-chair of BPC's Energy Project.

Jones is an Advisory Board Member of Spirit of America, a 501(c)(3) organization that supports the safety and success of Americans serving abroad and the local people and partners they seek to help.

=== National Security Advisor ===
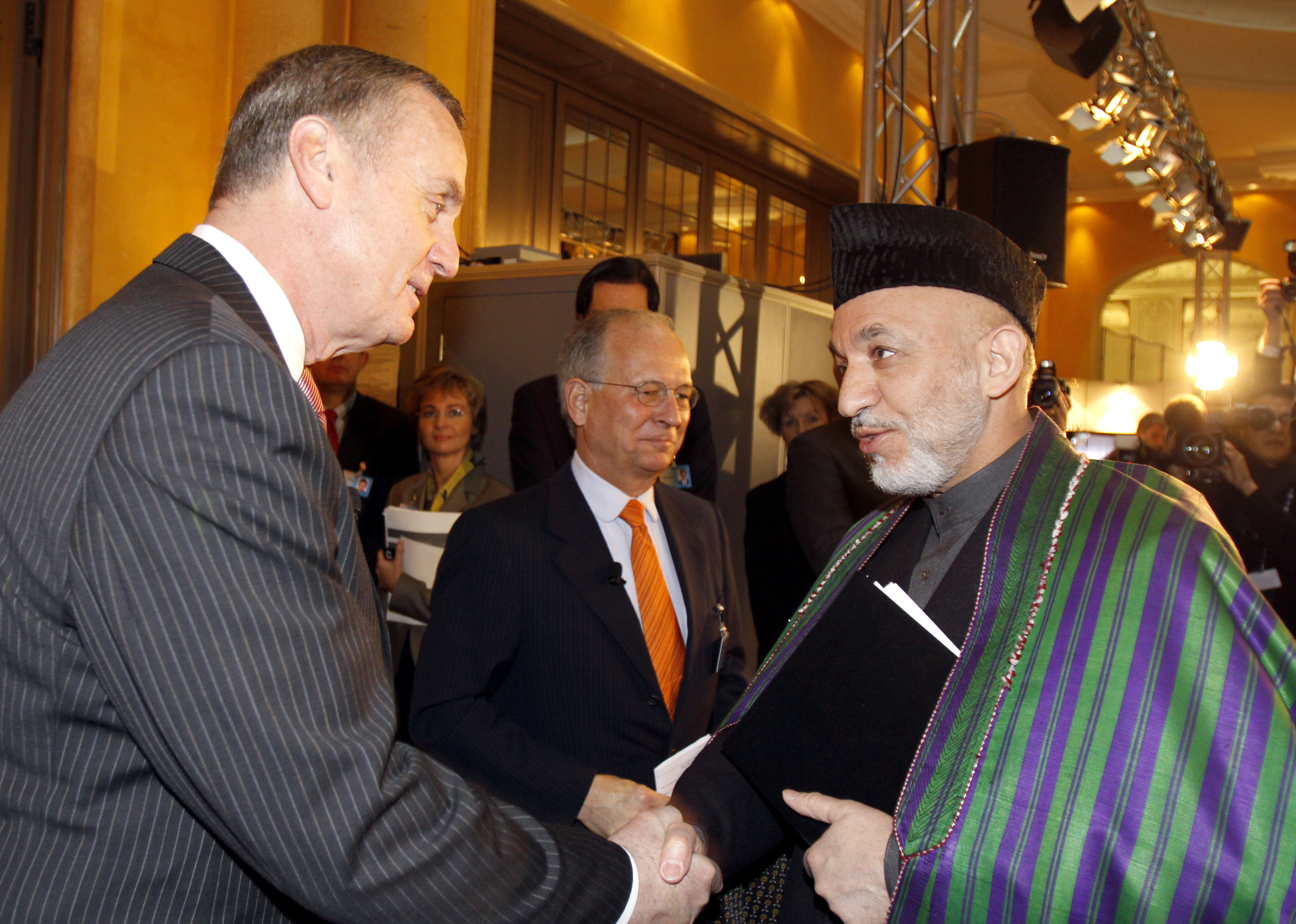
Jones shakes hands with President of Afghanistan Hamid Karzai.

On December 1, 2008, President-elect Obama announced Jones as his selection for National Security Advisor. The National Security Advisor is appointed by the president without confirmation by the United States Senate.

The selection surprised people because, as Michael Crowley reported, "The two men didn't meet until Obama's foreign policy aide, Mark Lippert, arranged a 2005 sit-down, and, as of this October, Jones had only spoken to Obama twice". Crowley speculated that Jones' record suggests he is "someone who, unencumbered by strong ideological leanings, can evaluate ideas dispassionately whether they come from left or right", and, "This is probably why Obama picked him". Jones was also picked because he is well respected and likely to possess the skills to navigate the other prestigious and powerful cabinet members.

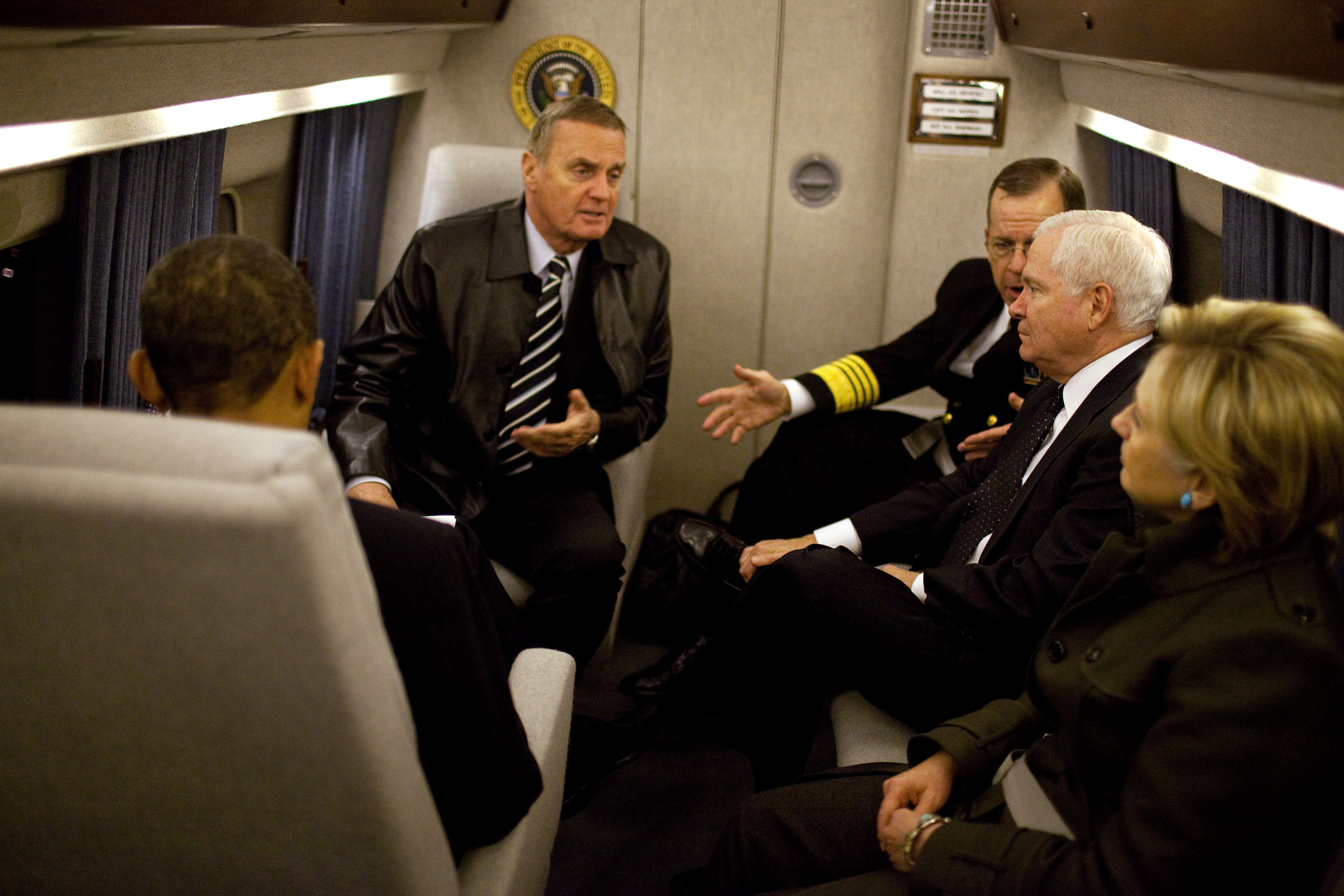
Interior of a VH-3D Sea King Marine One transporting President Obama and Gen Jones

Though he did not know Gates especially well, both men shared long experience in the national security establishment (Gates was in the Air Force and previously headed the CIA). Jones and Clinton had a more direct connection from her tenure on the Senate Armed Services Committee. The two were said to have particularly clicked at a 2005 conference on security policy in Munich. Jones hosted a small private dinner that included Clinton and South Carolina Republican Senator Lindsey Graham, among others; at the end of the convivial evening, according to one person present, Jones followed Clinton out to her car to visit in private.

Jones assumed the post when Obama was sworn into office on January 20, 2009. He announced his resignation as National Security Advisor on October 8, 2010, and was succeeded by Thomas E. Donilon.

=== Advocate for Iranian dissidents ===
In March 2013, Jones was quoted comparing the conditions for Iranians in a US camp in Iraq with the conditions of detention for captives held in the Guantanamo Bay detention camps. While addressing the Iranian American Cultural Society of Michigan, Jones said Guantanamo captives "are treated far better" than the Iranian internees. Jones criticized other aspects of the Obama administration's policy on Iran. Foreign Policy magazine noted that Jones had not volunteered whether he had been paid for this speaking engagement.

=== Middle East consultancy ===
In March 2017, Jones reportedly began working as a paid consultant for the Ministry of Defense (Saudi Arabia). In 2019, he began working for the government of Libya, but stopped after a few months at the request of the State Department.

== Personal life ==
Former Secretary of Defense William Cohen, who hired Jones as his military assistant, said that Jones has a placid demeanor and a "methodical approach to problems—he's able to view issues at both the strategic and tactical level".

Jones was also responsible for convincing country music artist Toby Keith that he should record and publish his popular concert hit "Courtesy of the Red, White, & Blue (The Angry American)".

Jones is married. He and his wife Diane are the parents of three sons and one daughter.

== See also ==
- James L. Jones Sr., decorated World War II Marine Corps officer, father of General James L. Jones Jr.
- William K. Jones, decorated Marine Corps lieutenant general, served in combat in three wars; uncle of General James L. Jones

== General references ==
- "General James L. Jones, Jr. – Retired". General Officer Biographies. United States Marine Corps. Archived from the original on March 18, 2012.
- "General James L. Jones, USMC (Retired)". Who's Who in Marine Corps History. United States Marine Corps History Division. Archived from the original on June 15, 2011.
- "General James L. Jones". SHAPE Biographies. Allied Command Operations, NATO. December 2, 2008. Archived from the original on February 16, 2003.
- "National Security Advisor: General James L. Jones, USMC (Ret)". National Security Council. White House. Archived from the original on December 25, 2012.
- Thompson, Mark (December 1, 2008). "All the President's Men—National Security Advisor: James Jones Jr". TIME. Archived from the original on December 5, 2008.

=== Attribution ===
Military offices
| Preceded by Charles Krulak | Commandant of the Marine Corps; 1999–2003 | Succeeded by Michael Hagee |
| Preceded by Joseph Ralston | Commander of United States European Command; 2003–2006 | Succeeded by Bantz Craddock |
| Preceded by Joseph Ralston | Supreme Allied Commander Europe; 2003–2006 | Succeeded by Bantz Craddock |
Political offices
| Preceded by Stephen Hadley | National Security Advisor; 2009–2010 | Succeeded by Tom Donilon |
