= James L. Jones Sr. =

American Marine Corps amphibious recon officer (1912–1986)

- Born: James Logan Jones; June 26, 1912; Kansas City, Missouri, U.S.
- Died: March 30, 1986 (aged 73); Fort Lauderdale, Florida, U.S.
- Burial place: Arlington National Cemetery
- Relatives: James L. Jones Jr. (son); William K. Jones (brother)
- Military career
- Allegiance: United States of America
- Branch: US Army Reserve (1933–1938); US Marine Corps (1941–1945)
- Rank: Colonel
- Units: Observer Group (1941); Amphib Recon Bn (1941–1945)
- Conflicts: World War II: Battle of Tarawa; Battle of Makin; Battle of Apamama; Battle of Eniwetok; Battle of Saipan; Battle of Tinian; Battle of Iwo Jima; Battle of Okinawa
- Awards: Silver Star; Legion of Merit (2)

James Logan Jones Sr. (June 26, 1912 – March 30, 1986) was decorated intelligence officer in the United States Marine Corps (USMC) and, according to the American Intelligence Journal, is recognized as "the founding father of amphibious reconnaissance". During World War II, in the Fleet Marine Force (FMF), he pioneered the United States' first amphibious reconnaissance units, the Observer Group and the FMF Amphib Recon companies, and was awarded the Silver Star.

He was the father of James L. Jones Jr., the 32nd Commandant of the United States Marine Corps, Supreme Allied Commander of Europe and U.S. National Security Advisor and the brother of LtGen William K. Jones (USMC), Navy Cross recipient.

== Early life and career ==
James Logan Jones was born on June 26, 1912, in Kansas City, Missouri, the son of Irene Catherine (née Kenefick) and Charles Vernon Jones. He grew up in Kansas City and Joplin, Missouri. His grandfather founded The Jones Store. He had a brother, William Kenefick Jones (who became a Marine lieutenant general). James Jones graduated from Shattuck Military School, Faribault, Minnesota, in 1930. He then studied law at Rockhurst College for a year, then at Kansas City School of Law and Northwestern University law school. In 1935, he was admitted to the bar in Missouri.

In 1936, he joined the International Harvester Company (IHC) working as a sales representative. By 1937, he was sent to Africa, where he furnished various agencies and contractors with specifications and data on motor trucks and tractors. He traveled extensively in northern and western Africa, from Dakar in Senegal, to the province of Southwest Africa, and later to Casablanca, Morocco, to cover the area from Gibraltar to the mouth of the Congo River. During this time, he learned to speak several languages.

== Military service ==
Jones signed for commission in the United States Army Reserve, serving from September 13, 1933, to September 5, 1938. With the onset of World War II, in 1940, IHC recalled him from Africa, due to the military presence of Nazi Germany forces. IHC sent him to the Canal Zone, and while there, he applied for a commission in the United States Marine Corps upon the suggestion of his brother, William K. Jones. His application was initially denied due to his age of 27. However, one of his references, the admiral in charge of the Caribbean area, persuaded the Marine Corps commandant, General Thomas Holcomb to reconsider. Jones was subsequently approached by a colonel, a lieutenant colonel, and a major asking him to resubmit his application. He resubmitted his application, which was accepted and he transferred his Army commission for a commission in the Marine Forces Reserve, and on February 3, 1941, he was commissioned as a Marine Corps 2nd lieutenant.

In May 1941, Jones began active duty at Marine Corps Barracks, Quantico, Virginia, and was assigned to the 1st Marine Division (1st MARDIV), Fleet Marine Force (FMF). While at Quantico, he completed the Reserve Officers' training and then served as the Commanding Officer (CO), Headquarters Company, Task Force 18, Atlantic Fleet.

Jones was fluent in several foreign languages and was extremely familiar with the target area of Africa; had experience in mechanical and mechanized vehicles and machinery; had experience in living in foreign lands; and had a military schooling and background. Because of these qualifications, he was assigned to the intelligence section on the Amphibious Corps staff of the Observer Group, serving with the group from February 1942 until September 1942. During this time, he was promoted to captain. He became the commanding officer of the Amphibious Corps, Pacific Fleet's (ACPF) Amphib Recon Company on January 7, 1943.

From 1943 to 1944, he served as the commanding officer of the Amphibious Reconnaissance Company and was part of the Gilbert and Marshall Islands campaign for which he received two Legion of Merit awards. In November 1943, putting ashore from the submarine USS Nautilus, Jones and the V Amphibious Corps Reconnaissance Company attacked and took the Japanese-held atoll of Abemama during Operation Boxcloth, part of the larger U.S. effort to seize the Gilbert Islands Due to the success of his reconnaissance company, at the recommendation of General Holland Smith to the Marine Corps commandant, the company became a battalion.

From 1944 to 1945, he was the commanding officer of the Amphibious Reconnaissance Battalion which participated in the Saipan-Tinian-Okinawa Campaign. He was awarded the Silver Star for “conspicuous gallantry and intrepidity as Commanding Officer of the Amphibious Reconnaissance Battalion, Fifth Amphibious Corps" from March 26–29 and April 6–7, 1945 in the Battle of Okinawa, where in the face of “heavy hostile rifle, machine- gun and mortar fire,” under his direction, their reconnaissance gathered information key to the success of the U.S. assault.

After spending 25 months of combat duty in the Pacific during World War II from 1943 to 1945, he returned to the States to a post at the recruit depot at Parris Island He left active duty on February 15, 1946.

He returned to the Marine Reserve and was promoted to lieutenant colonel in August 1951. He retired in January 1958, and was promoted to Colonel due to his heroism in World War II.

== Post-military career ==
After leaving active duty in 1946, Jones returned to his sales position with International Harvester. With IHC, he and his family lived in Paris, France, and later Brussels, Belgium.

== Personal life and death ==
In 1942, Jones married Charlotte Ground, and they had three children. His son, James Logan Jones Jr., would serve as the 21st Commandant of the Marines Corps, the Supreme Allied Commander-Europe, and the National Security Advisor.

Jones died on March 30, 1986, in Fort Lauderdale, Florida. He is buried in Arlington National Cemetery.
