= Oniore Waterfall and Toba First Cave Natural Monuments =

- IUCN category III (natural monument or feature)
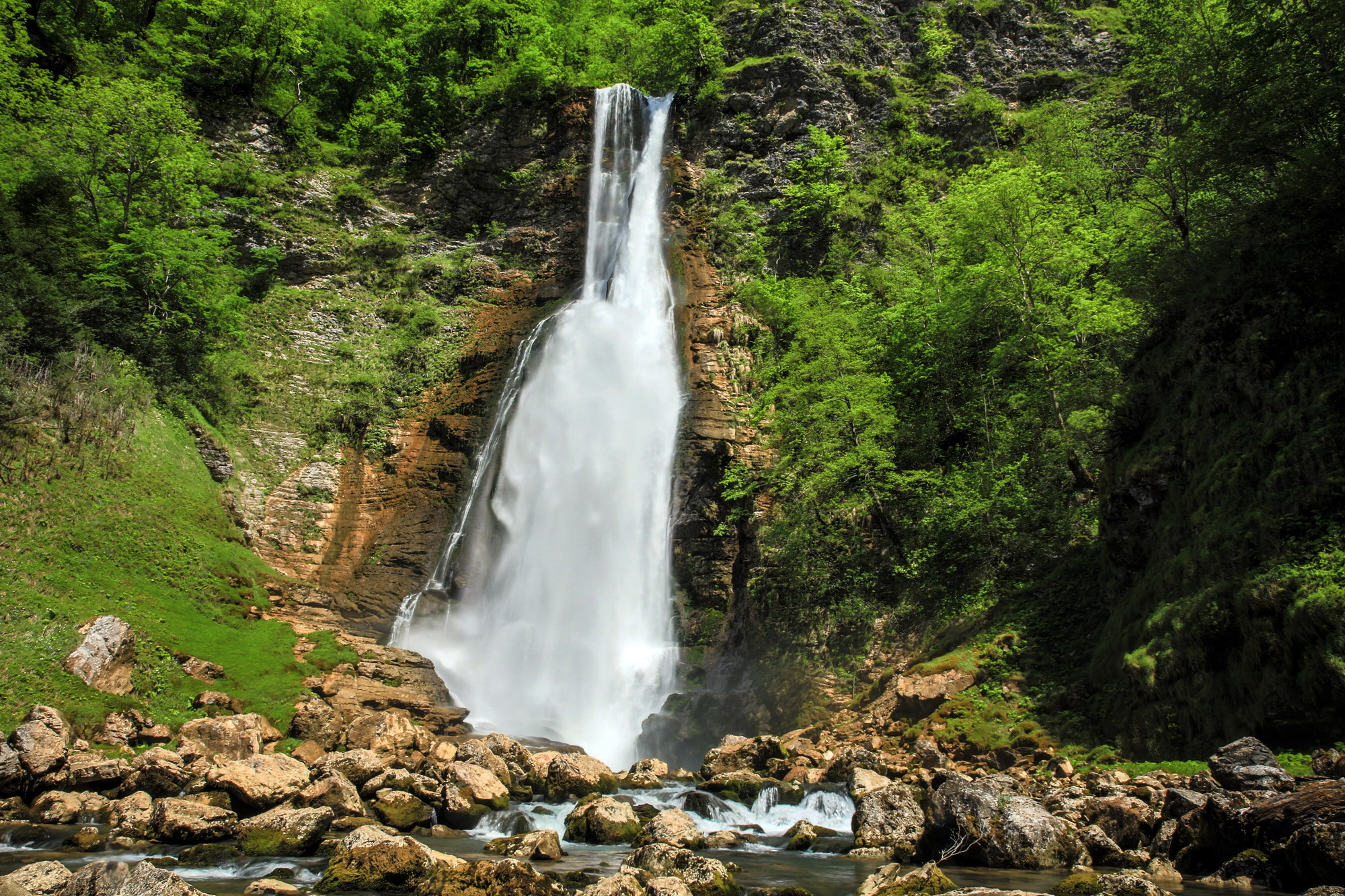
- Oniore Waterfall

- Location within Georgia Location within Samegrelo-Zemo Svaneti
- Nearest city: Martvili
- Coordinates: 42°28.643′N 42°27.520′E
- Area: 0.33 km^{2} (0.13 sq mi)
- Governing body: Agency of Protected Areas
- Website: ონიორის ჩანჩქერისა და ტობის პირველი მღვიმის ბუნები ძეგლები

Oniore Waterfall and Toba First Cave Natural Monuments (Georgian: ოჩხომურის ჩანჩქერის ბუნების ძეგლი) is a combination of waterfall and cave at 680 m above sea level in Martvili Municipality, Samegrelo-Zemo Svaneti region of Georgia.

The cave is produced in the limestone. The excavation measured 12m X 5 m is opened along the shaft. The underground waterfall is about 70 m from the cave entrance, where the height of the ceiling is 30 meters. The width of the tunnel is 12-15 m. The waterfall is about 67 m high.

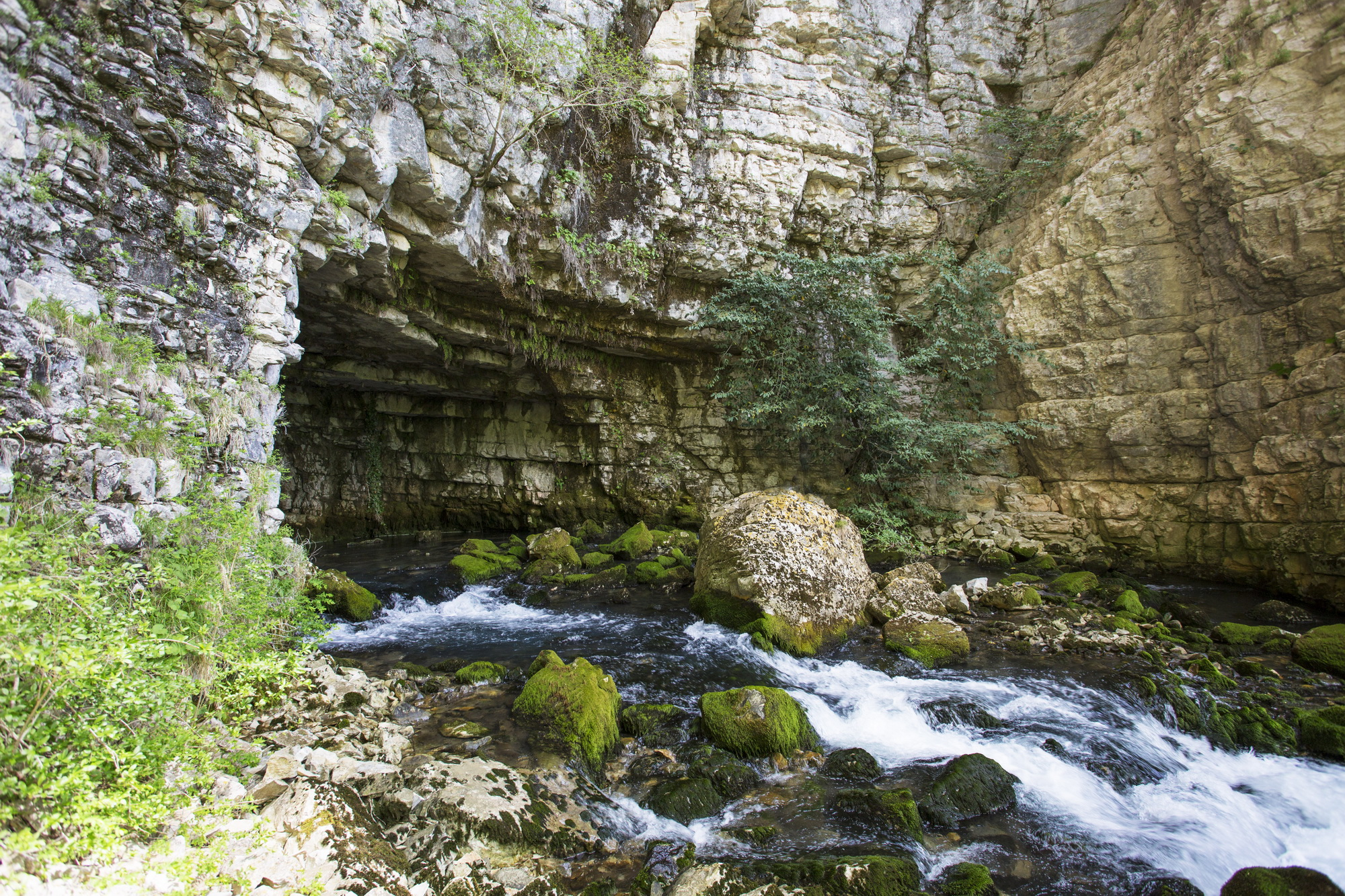
Toba First Cave

== See also ==
- Toba Waterfall and Arsen Okrojanashvili Cave Natural Monument
