= LCRS =

World War II landing craft

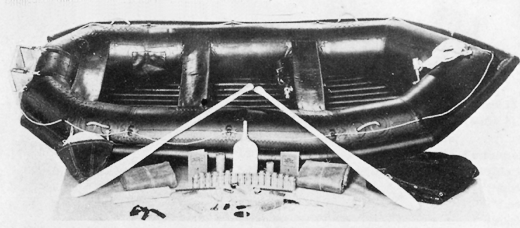
LCRS with equipment

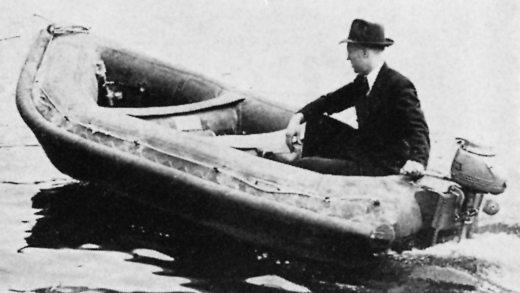
LCRS outboard

The LCRS (Landing Craft Rubber Small) was a small inflatable boat which was used by the United States Navy and USMC from 1938 to 1945. During World War II 8,150 LCRSs were made. It had a weight of 95 kilograms (210 lb) and could transport seven men. With no armor, LCRL were often used at night for Amphibious warfare. Most were built by the Goodyear Tire and Rubber Company.

Army Lt. Lloyd Peddicord of the Observer Group designed an inflatable boat and brought his plans to the Goodyear Tire and Rubber Company, which produced the craft.

The Naval Combat Demolition Units were organised in a six-man team of an officer, a petty officer and four seamen using a seven-man LCRS inflatable boat to carry their explosives and gear.

== See also ==
- Landing Craft Rubber Large
- Rigid-hulled inflatable boat

== External links and references ==
- Specifications and pictures at ibiblio
- Transport Doctrine - Amphibious Forces U.S. Pacific Fleet: Chapter VIII - Rubber Boat Operations (September 1944)
