= Michael Hagee =

United States Marine Corps general (born 1944)

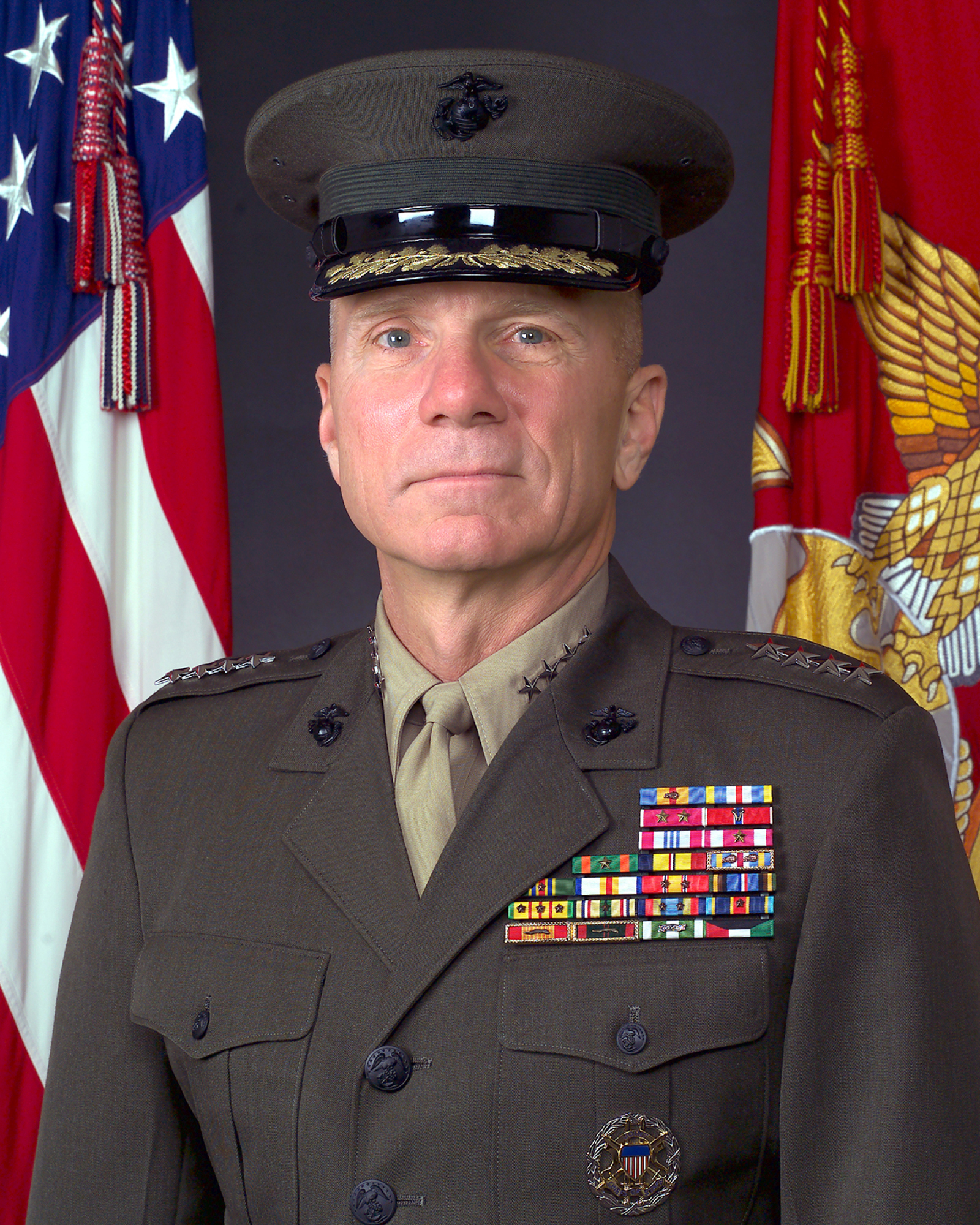
- Official portrait, 2003
- Born: December 1, 1944 (age 81); Hampton, Virginia, U.S.
- Military career
- Allegiance: United States
- Branch: United States Marine Corps
- Service years: 1968–2007
- Rank: General
- Commands: Commandant of the Marine Corps; 1st Marine Expeditionary Force; 1st Marine Division; 1st Marine Division; 11th Marine Expeditionary Unit; 1st Battalion 8th Marines
- Conflicts: Vietnam War; Gulf War
- Awards: Defense Distinguished Service Medal (3); Defense Superior Service Medal; Legion of Merit (3); Bronze Star Medal; National Intelligence Distinguished Service Medal

Michael William Hagee (born December 1, 1944) is a retired United States Marine Corps four-star general who served as the 33rd Commandant of the Marine Corps from 2003 to 2006, succeeding General James L. Jones on January 13, 2003. He stepped down as Commandant two months before the end of his four-year term, and was succeeded by General James T. Conway on November 13, 2006. On that date, Hagee had his retirement ceremony just prior to the passage of command ceremony. Hagee retired from the Marine Corps on January 1, 2007.

== Biography ==
Hagee was born in Hampton, Virginia, on December 1, 1944 and raised in Fredericksburg, Texas. His father, Robert L. Hagee, served as a United States Navy pilot in World War II and, in the summer of 2009, was awarded a plaque at the Admiral Nimitz State Historic Site, now known as the National Museum of the Pacific War (formerly Nimitz Museum) in Fredericksburg, Texas. He and his wife Silke, daughter of the German Air Force brigadier general Werner Boie, have two children.

He graduated with distinction from the United States Naval Academy in 1968 with a Bachelor of Science degree in Engineering and was a classmate of Oliver North, Charles Bolden, Jim Webb, and Michael Mullen. He also holds a Master of Science degree in electrical engineering from the Naval Postgraduate School and a Master of Arts degree in National Security and Strategic Studies from the Naval War College. He is a graduate of the Command and Staff College and the United States Naval War College. In 2004, he was honored with the Naval War College Distinguished Graduate Leadership Award.

Hagee was the commander of the Marine Corps at the time of the Haditha massacre, in which more than 20 Iraqi civilians were killed by US Marines. In a later oral history interview with a military historian, Hagee expressed pride in covering up photos from the massacre, stating that "the press never got them", thus distinguishing the event from Abu Ghraib.

Hagee is the president and CEO of the Admiral Nimitz Foundation. He has previously sat on the Board of Advisors for Cobam and Silicon Graphics.

== Awards and decorations ==

1st Row	Defense Distinguished Service Medal with two oak leaf clusters	Defense Superior Service Medal	Legion of Merit with two award stars	Bronze Star with valor device
2nd Row	Defense Meritorious Service Medal	Meritorious Service Medal with one award star	Navy and Marine Corps Achievement Medal with one award star	Combat Action Ribbon
3rd Row	Joint Meritorious Unit Award with two oak leaf clusters	Meritorious Unit Commendation with one service star	National Intelligence Distinguished Service Medal	National Defense Service Medal with two service stars
4th Row	Armed Forces Expeditionary Medal	Vietnam Service Medal with three service stars	Southwest Asia Service Medal with one service star	Global War on Terrorism Service Medal
5th Row	Humanitarian Service Medal	Sea Service Deployment Ribbon with two service stars	Navy and Marine Corps Overseas Service Ribbon with one service star	French Legion of Honor, Commander
6th Row	Vietnam Gallantry Cross Unit Citation	Vietnam Civil Actions Unit Citation	Vietnam Campaign Medal	Kuwait Liberation Medal
Office of the Joint Chiefs of Staff Identification Badge

== See also ==
- List of United States Marine Corps four-star generals

Military offices
Preceded by James L. Jones	Commandant of the Marine Corps; 2003–2006	Succeeded by James T. Conway
