= Inflatable boat =

Lightweight boat constructed with flexible tubes containing pressurized gas

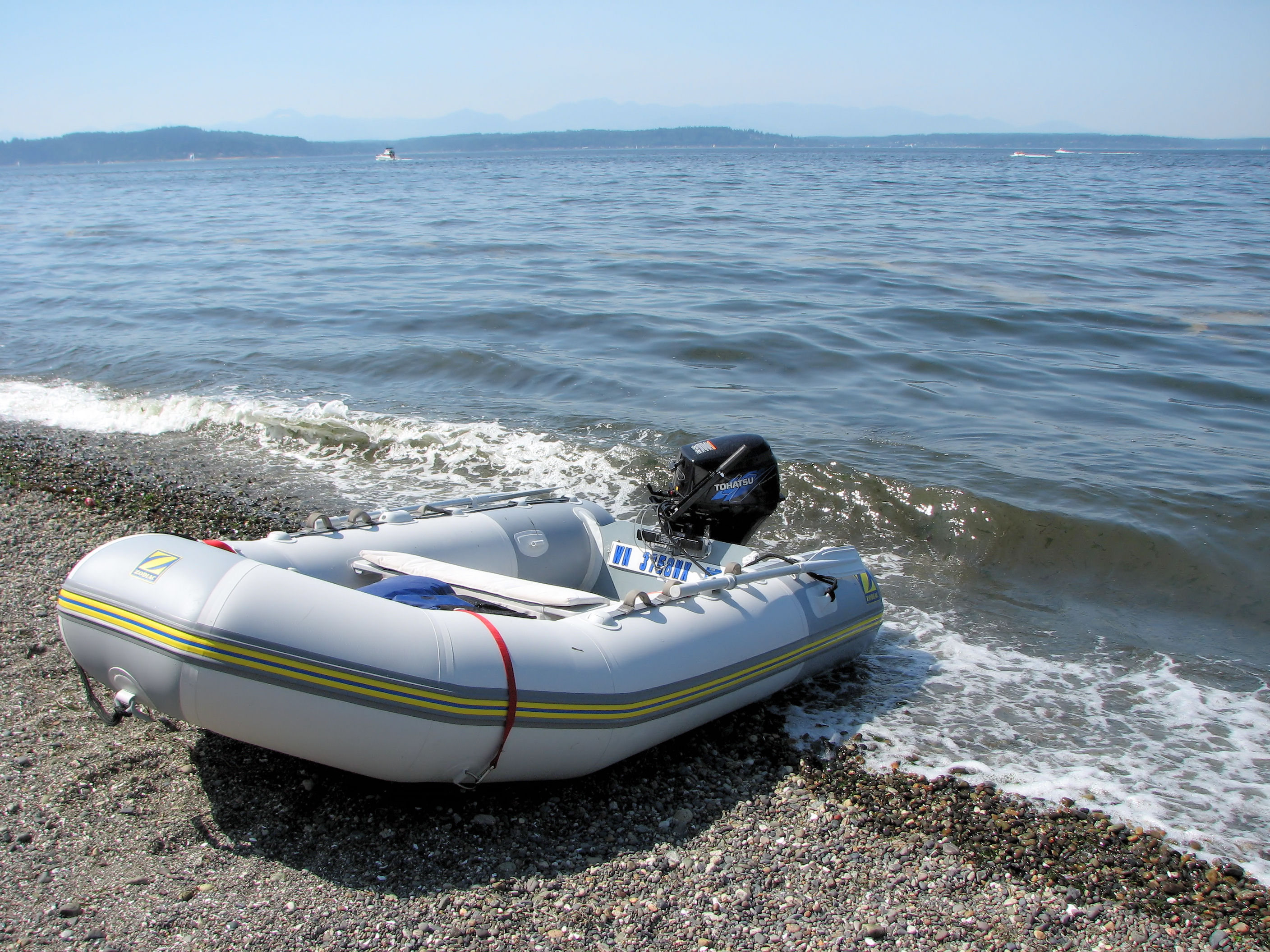
A PVC inflatable boat on a beach

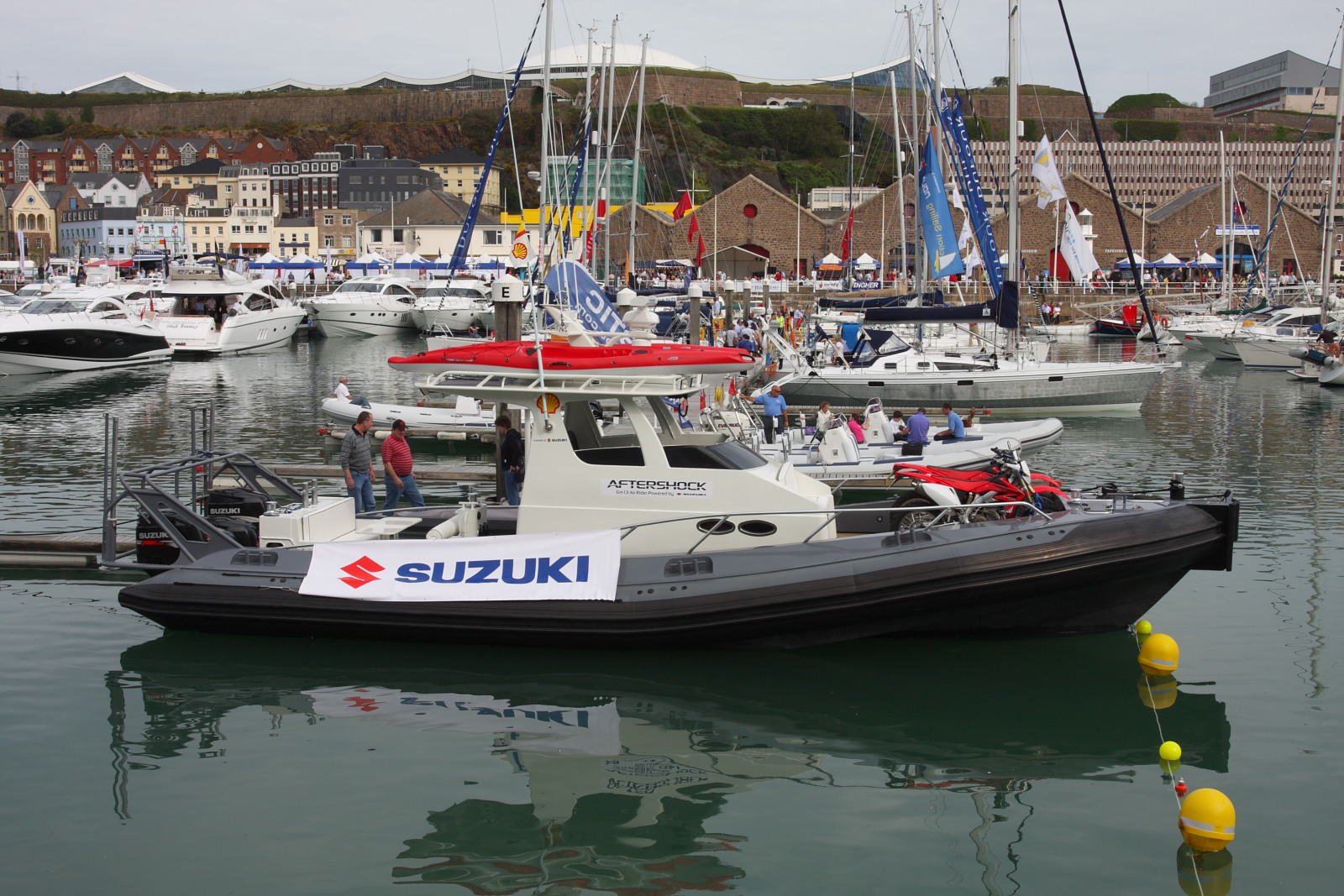
A modern, specialized rigid inflatable boat

An inflatable boat is a lightweight boat constructed with its sides and bow made of flexible tubes containing pressurized gas. For smaller boats, the floor and hull are often flexible, while for boats longer than 3 metres (9.8 ft), the floor typically consists of three to five rigid plywood or aluminium sheets fixed between the tubes, but not joined rigidly together. Often the transom is rigid, providing a location and structure for mounting an outboard motor.

Some inflatable boats can be disassembled and packed into a small volume, so that they can be easily stored and transported. The boat, when inflated, is kept rigid cross-ways by a foldable removable thwart. This feature makes these boats suitable for liferafts for larger boats or aircraft, and for travel or recreational purposes.

== History ==
=== Early attempts ===
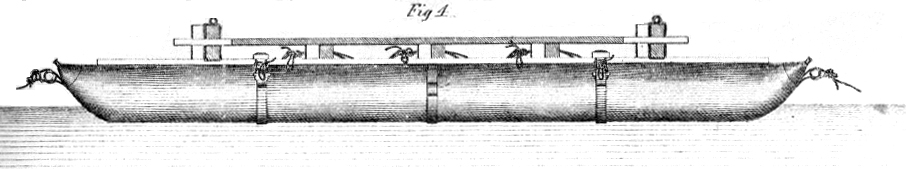
A rubber coated fabric bridge pontoon

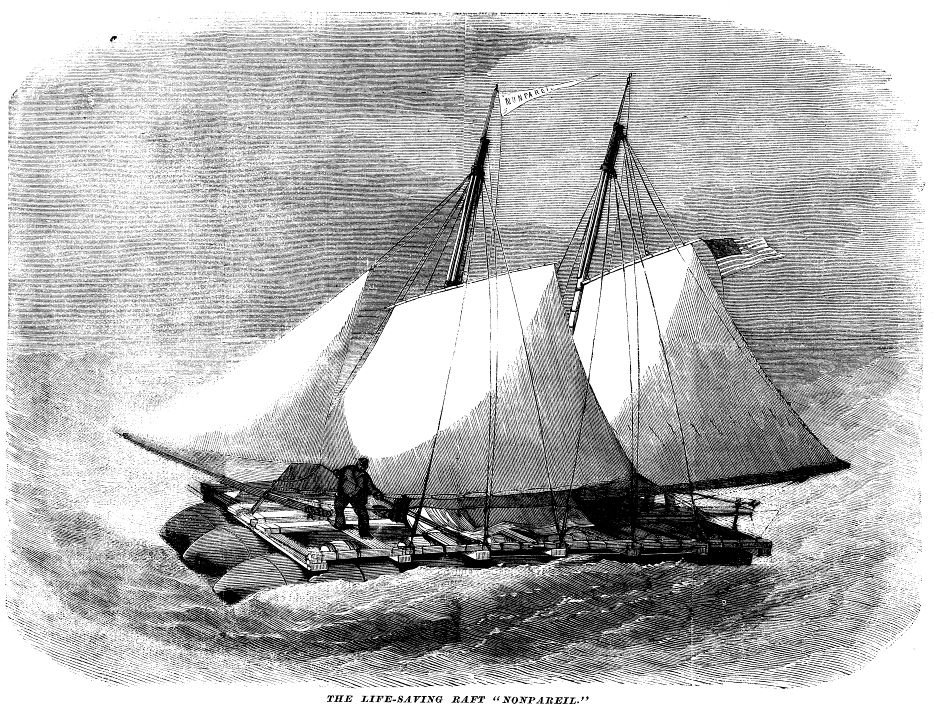
The Nonpareil inflatable boat

There are ancient carved images of animal skins filled with air being used as one-man floats to cross rivers. These floats were inflated by mouth.

The discovery of the process to vulcanize rubber was made by Charles Goodyear in 1838, and was granted a US patent in 1844. Vulcanization stabilized the rubber, making it durable and flexible. In late 1843, Thomas Hancock filed for a UK patent, which was also granted in 1844, after the Goodyear Tire and Rubber Company patent had been granted. In 1852, while traveling in England, Charles Goodyear discovered that Thomas Hancock's company was producing vulcanized rubber and sued. Thomas Hancock had been shown a sample of Goodyear's rubber in 1842, but had not been told the process that made it—and Hancock said he had developed his process independently. The last of the suits were settled in 1855. Shortly thereafter, several people expanded on experimentation of rubber coated fabrics.

In 1839 the Duke of Wellington tested the first inflatable pontoons. In 1840, the English scientist Thomas Hancock designed inflatable craft using his new methods of rubber vulcanization and described his achievements in The Origin and Progress of India Rubber Manufacture in England published a few years later.

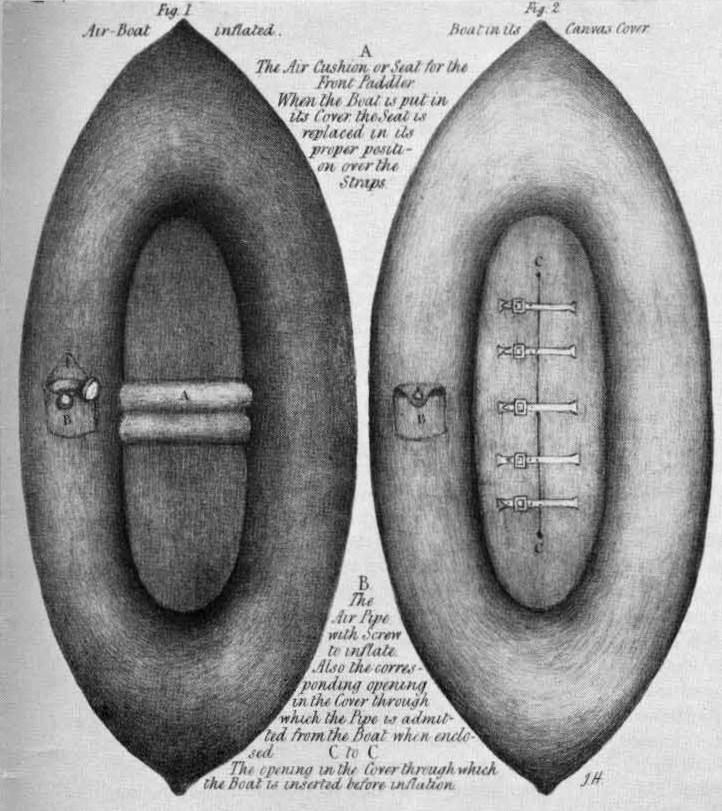
A two-man Halkett boat, with and without its canvas cover

In 1844–1845, British naval officer Lieutenant Peter Halkett developed two types of inflatable boats intended for use by Arctic explorers. Both were made of rubber-impregnated "Mackintosh cloth." In the Halkett boat, the "boat cloak" served as a waterproof poncho or cloak until inflated, when it became a one-man boat. A special pocket held bellows for inflation, and a blade to turn a walking stick into a paddle. A special umbrella could double as a sail. Halkett later developed a two-man boat carried in a knapsack. When inflated, it could carry two men paddling on either side, and when deflated it served as a waterproof blanket for camping on wet ground. The Admiralty was sceptical about potential uses for Halkett's designs; on 8 May 1845, Lord Herbert, First Secretary to the Admiralty, wrote to Halkett that "My Lords are of an opinion that your invention is extremely clever and ingenious, and that it might be useful in Exploring and Surveying Expeditions, but they do not consider that it would be made applicable for general purposes in the Naval Service".

The Admiralty saw no use for Halkett's designs in general naval service, but explorers liked this larger design. John Franklin bought one for the ill-fated 1845 expedition, in which the entire expedition party of 129 men and two ships vanished.

In his explorations along the Oregon Trail, and the tributaries and forks of the Platte River in 1842 and 1843, John C. Frémont recorded what may have been the first use of an inflatable rubber boat for travel down rivers and rapids in the Rocky Mountains. In his account of the expedition he described his boat:

Among the useful things which formed a portion of our equipage, was an India-rubber boat, 18 feet long, made somewhat in the form of a bark canoe of the northern lakes. The sides were formed by two airtight cylinders, eighteen inches in diameter, connected with others forming the bow and stern. To lessen the danger of accidents to the boat, these were divided into four different compartments, and the interior was sufficiently large to contain five or six persons, and a considerable weight of baggage.

In 1848, General George Cullum, the US Army Corps of Engineers, introduced a rubber coated fabric inflatable bridge pontoon, which was used in the Mexican–American War and later on to a limited extent during the American Civil War.

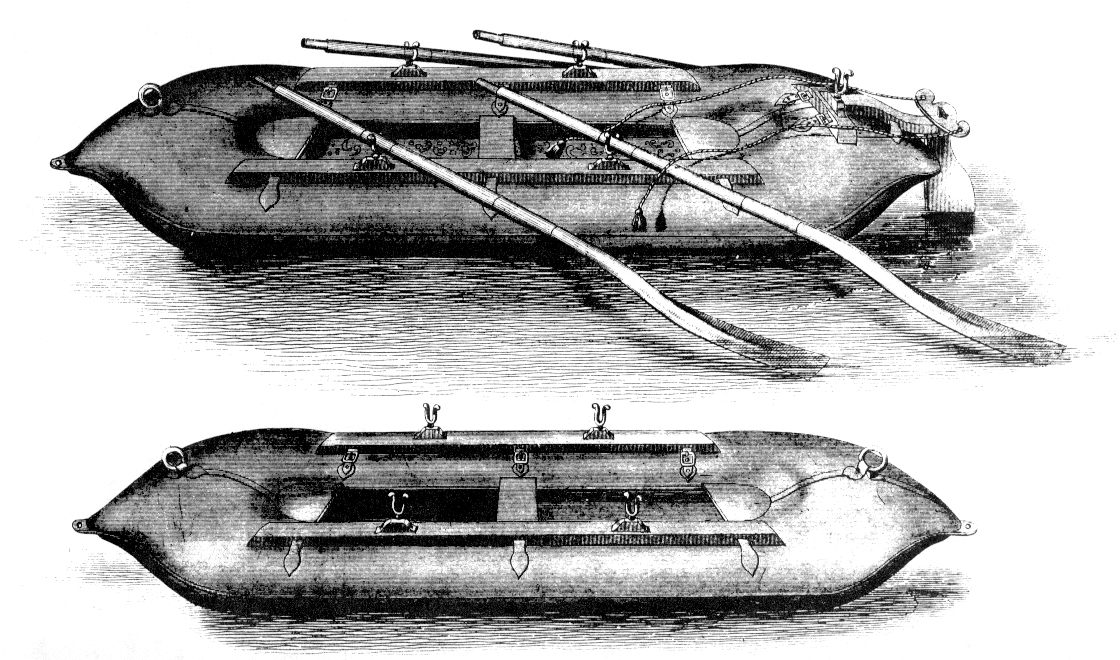
An inflatable rubber boat, c. 1855

In 1866, four men crossed the Atlantic Ocean from New York to Britain on a three-tube raft called Nonpareil.

From 1900 to 1910, the development of rubber manufacturing enabled attempts at producing circular rubber inflatable boats, similar to modern coracles. These were only usable as rafts, and could only be propelled by paddling. In addition, they tended to crack at seams and folds due to the imperfect manufacturing process of the rubber.

=== Modern inflatable boat ===
In the early 20th century, independent production of inflatable boats began with the airship manufacturing company RFD in England and the Zodiac company in France. This was brought about by the development of rubber-coated fabrics for the airship industry.

Reginald Foster Dagnall, English designer and founder of RFD, switched in 1919 to the development of inflatable boats, using the coated fabric from hydrogen airships. The Air Ministry was impressed with trials of his boat on a lake near Guildford and began to give his firm contracts for the production of life-saving equipment.

Meanwhile, in France a similar pattern emerged. The airship company Zodiac began to develop inflatable rubber boats, and in 1934, invented the inflatable kayak and catamaran. These led to the modern Zodiac inflatable boat. The company became Zodiac Nautic in 2015.

Development continued after World War II with the discovery of new synthetic materials, such as neoprene and new adhesives, which allowed the boats to become sturdier and less prone to damage.

=== World War II ===
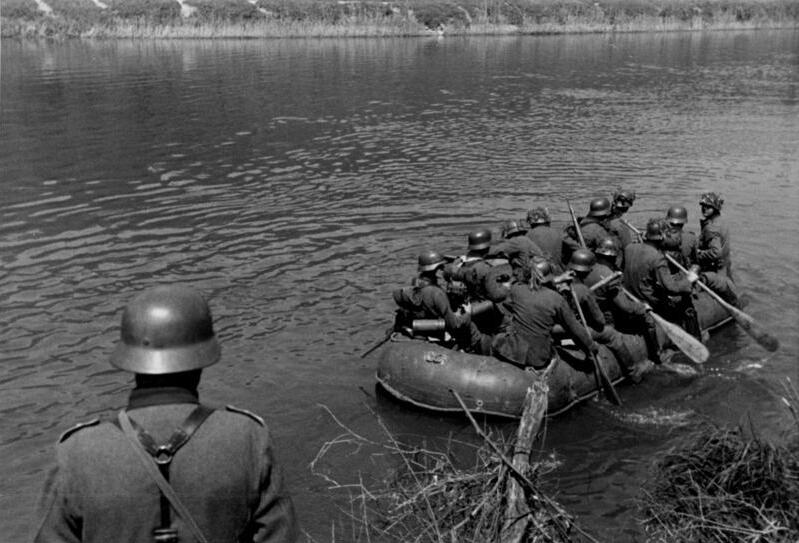
German soldiers crossing the Meuse in an inflatable assault boat during the Second World War

Submarine warfare in the Battle of the Atlantic led to casualties among warships and merchant ships. In the military, inflatable boats were used to transport torpedoes and other cargo. They also helped troops land in shallow water, and their compact size made overland transport possible. The US had two standard boats the LCRL and LCRS.

The Marine Raiders were originally trained to carry out raids and landings from Landing Craft Rubber Large (LCRL) inflatable boats carried by high speed transports. In August 1942 the submarines USS Argonaut (SM-1) and USS Nautilus (SS-168) carried elements of the 2nd Raider Battalion who carried out the Makin Island raid from LCRL inflatable boats. Invasions of the Battle of Arawe by the 112th Cavalry Regiment and parts of the Battle of Tarawa involved amphibious landings in inflatable boats against heavy enemy resistance.

One of the models, the Zodiac brand inflatable boat, became popular with the military, and contributed significantly to the rise of the civilian inflatable boat industry in Europe and in the United States. After World War II, governments sold surplus inflatable boats to the public.

=== Post-war inflatables ===
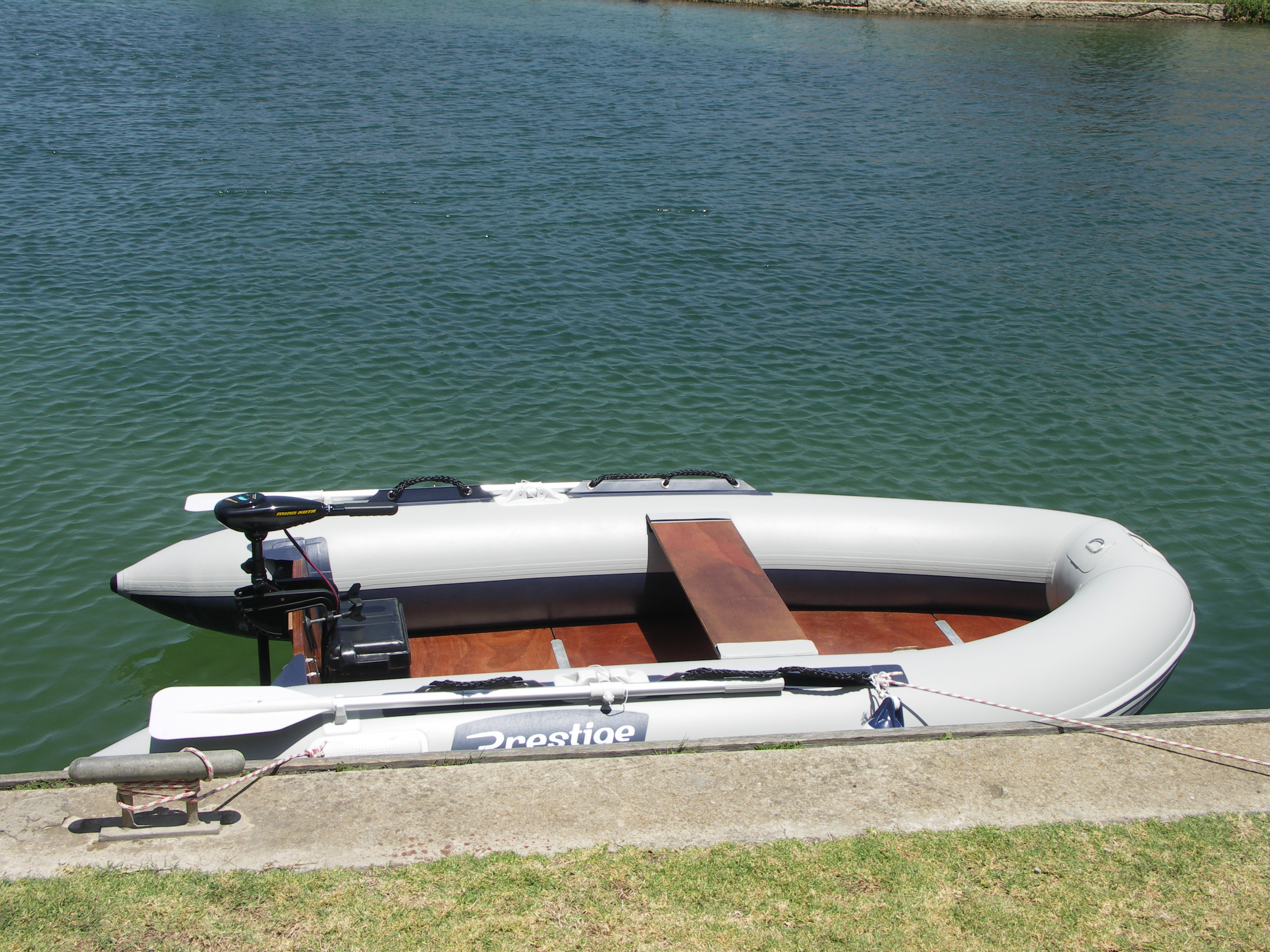
A modern Hypalon inflatable boat with rigid wooden floorboards, a transom and an inflatable keel, powered by a 12 volt electric trolling motor.

Inflatable liferafts were also used successfully to save crews of aircraft that ditched in the sea; bombing, naval and anti-submarine aircraft flying long distances over water being much more common from the start of WWII. In the 1950s, the French Navy officer and biologist Alain Bombard was the first to combine the outboard engine, a rigid floor and a boat shaped inflatable. The former airplane-manufacturer Zodiac built that boat and a friend of Bombard, the diver Jacques-Yves Cousteau began to use it, after Bombard sailed across the Atlantic Ocean with his inflatable in 1952. Cousteau was convinced by the shallow draught and good performance of this type of boat and used it as tenders on his expeditions.

The inflatable boat was so successful that Zodiac lacked the manufacturing capacity to satisfy demand. In the early 1960s, Zodiac licensed production to a dozen companies in other countries. In the 1960s, the British company Humber was the first to build Zodiac brand inflatable boats in the United Kingdom.

Some inflatables have inflated keels whose V-shape help the hull move through waves reducing the slamming effect caused by the flat hull landing back on the water surface after passing over the top of a wave at speed.

== Types ==
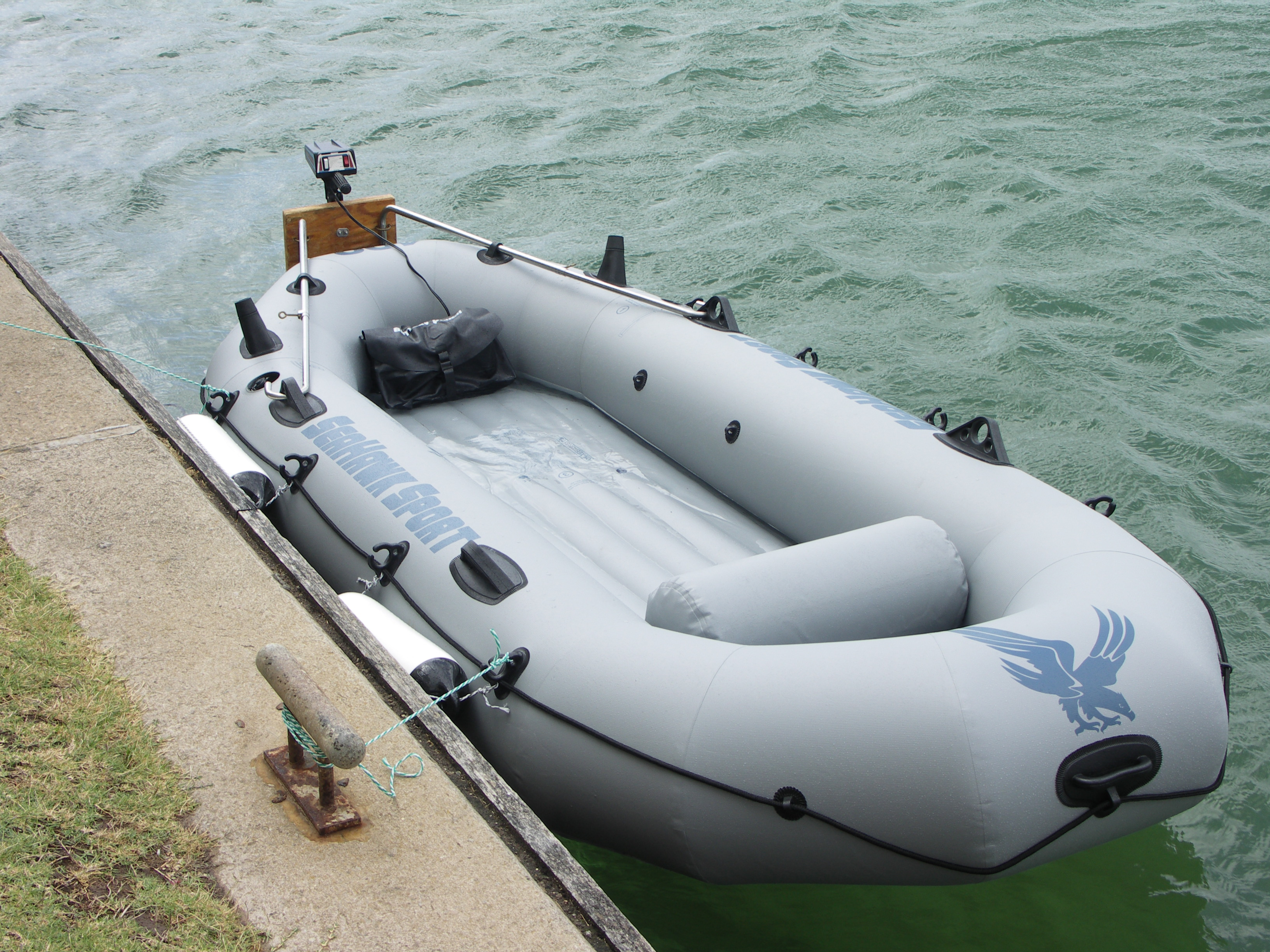
PVC inflatable with small electric trolling motor

Contemporary inflatable boats are manufactured using supported fabric. They are made of rubberized synthetic fabrics, PVC and polyurethane, providing light-weight and airtight sponsons. Depending on fabric choice, the fabric panels are assembled using either hot or cold manufacturing processes. Different styles of one-way valves are used to add or remove air, and some brands include inter-communicating valves that reduce the effect of a puncture.

Inflatable boats with transoms have an inflatable keel that creates a slight V-bottom along the line of the hull to improve the hull's seakeeping and directional stability. These vessels are very light, so if powered with an engine, it is best to put weight in the bow area to keep the bow from rising while the boat is going up on plane.

People increasingly use inflatables for personal recreational use on lakes, rivers, and oceans—and for white water rafting and kayaking, and for scuba divers to reach dive sites. Users can deflate, fold, and store fabric bottom inflatable boats in compact bags, making them ideal for limited storage and quick, easy access.

Sail rigs are available for inflatable dinghies, kayaks, and catamarans. In keeping with the portability of the inflatable hull, sail attachments fold or disassemble to fit in a compact bundle. Leeboards on the sides perform the same function as a centerboard, so users can tack these boats into the wind.

=== Rigid inflatable boat ===
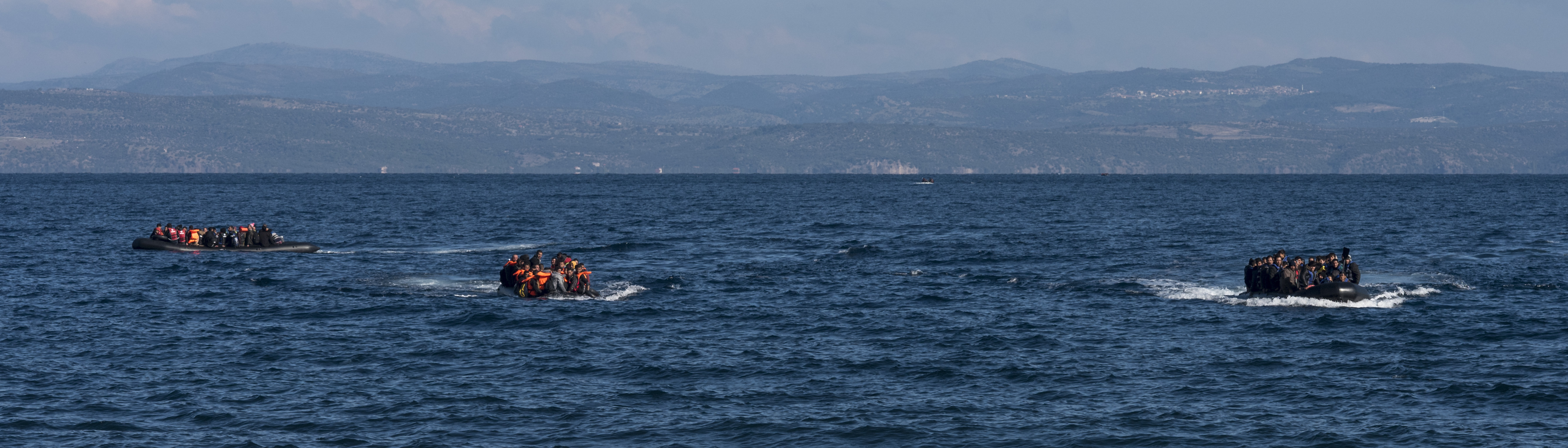
Inflatable boats have been used by refugees to cross the Aegean Sea from Turkey to Greece.

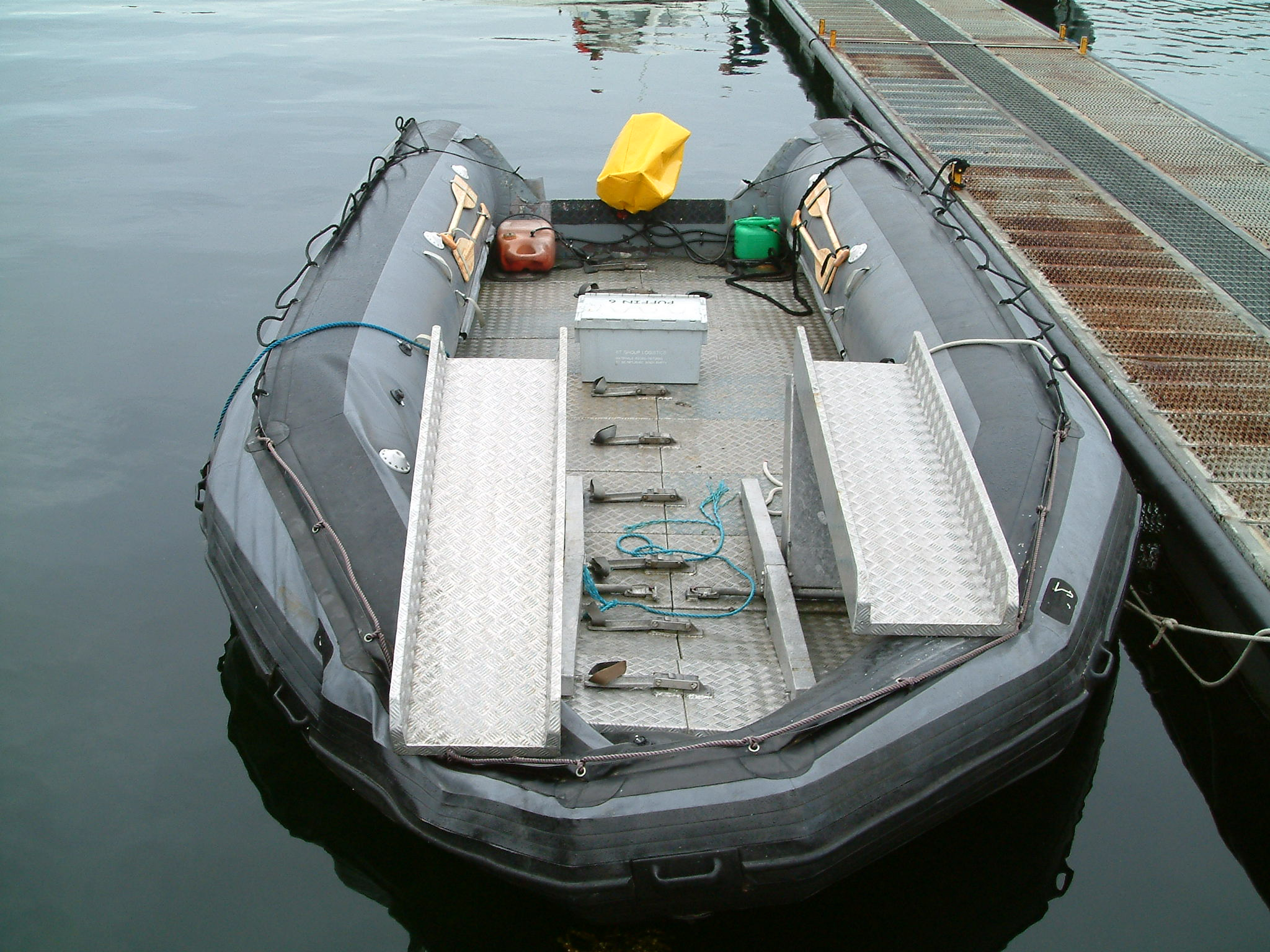
An inflatable boat capable of carrying a car.

The modern rigid inflatable boat (RIB) is a development of the inflatable boat, which has a rigid floor and solid hull. The external shape of the hull lets it cut through waves more easily giving a more comfortable ride when traveling fast in rough conditions. The structure of the hull is capable of supporting a more powerful transom mounted outboard engine or even an inboard engine.

=== Soft inflatable boat ===
A soft inflatable boat (SIB) lacks the solid hull of a RIB and often has a removable slatted floor, so the boat can be deflated and transported in a car or other vehicle. Such boats have a low draft and are therefore useful for traveling across shallow water and beaching in places without landing facilities.

Some SIBs have a rigid transom that can support an outboard engine. Inflatable boats with transoms have an inflatable keel that creates a slight V-bottom along the line of the hull to improve the hull's seakeeping and directional stability. These vessels are very light, so if powered with an engine, it is best to put weight in the bow area to keep the bow from rising while the boat is going up on plane.

Soft inflatable boats are available with several floor choices:

- Roll up slat floor
- Hard floor made of fiberglass, aluminum or wood panels
- Ribbed air floor (on inflatable rafts)
- High pressure air floor

== Uses ==
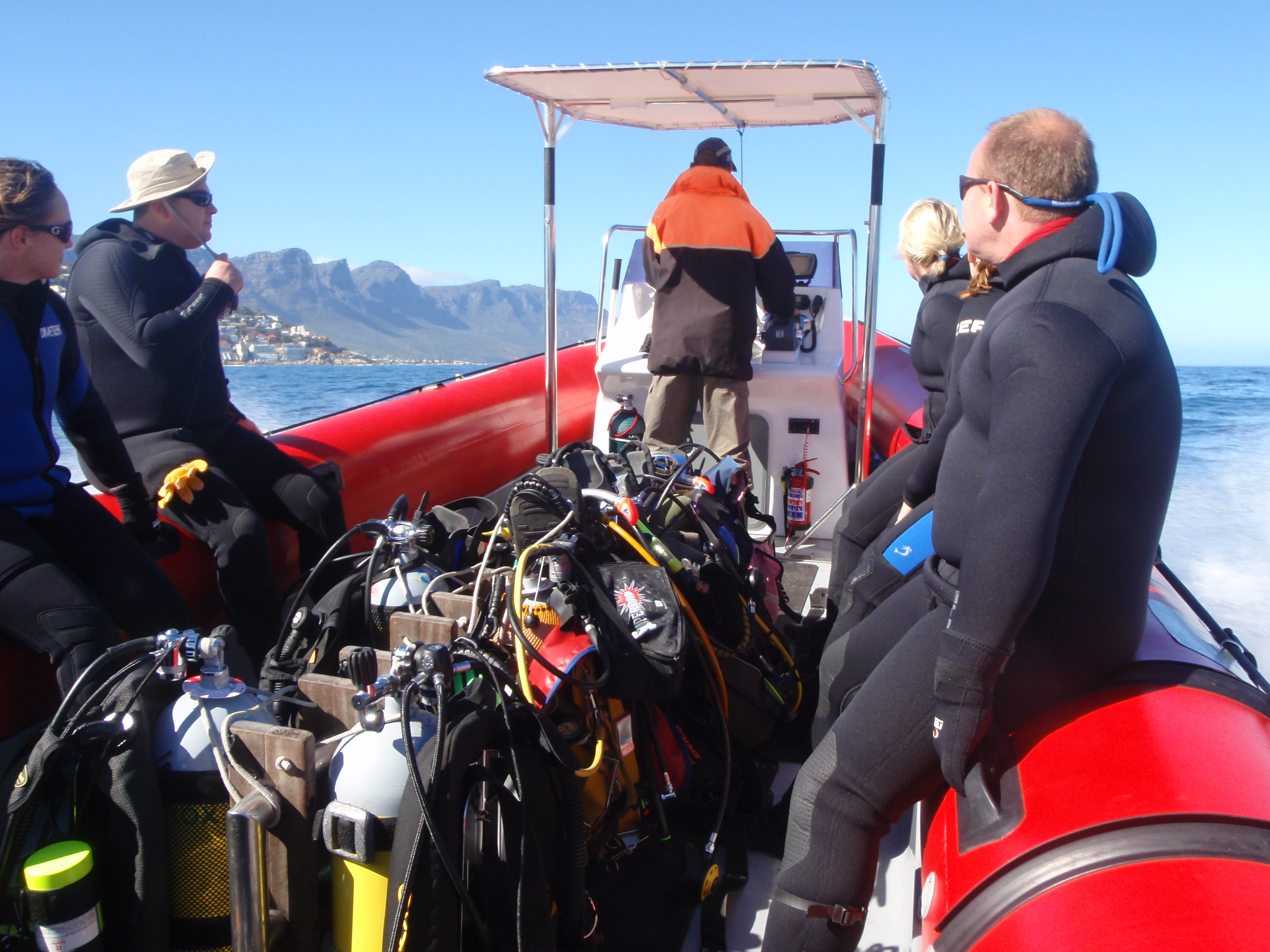
Rigid inflatable dive boat with central rack for scuba sets

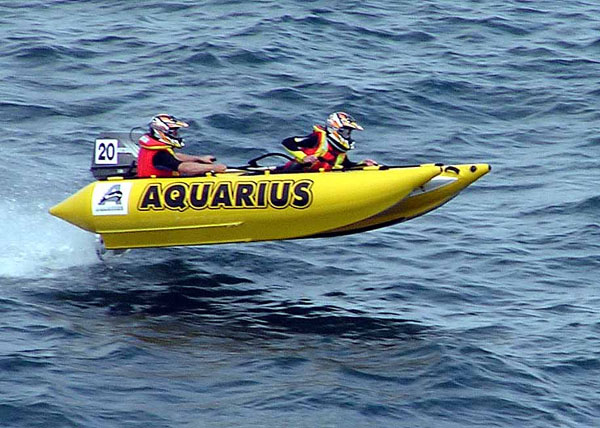
Offshore inflatable racing at Ilfracombe, North Devon, England. These boats can reach 100 km/h (62 mph).

Inflatables are commonly between 2 and 7 metres (6.6 and 23.0 ft) long and are propelled by outboard motors of 2.3 to 300 horsepower (1.7 to 223.7 kW). Due to their speed, portability, and weight, inflatable boats are used in diverse roles:

Inflatable and rigid-hulled inflatable boats are often used for short scuba diving excursions.

The International Convention for the Safety of Life at Sea publishes recommended regulations for inflatable boats used in rescue operations. Some life rafts also contain additional inflatable sections to ensure that the raft self-rights in heavy seas.

Inflatable life rafts have also been used since the 1930s on military aircraft that operate over water.

These boats are often used by special-operations units of the armed forces of several nations, for such purposes as landing on beaches. Because inflatable craft can be stored compactly they can also be transported on midget submarines such as those operated by the Advanced SEAL Delivery System. They have also been used by other forces without government sponsorship, such as guerrillas and pirates.

Lifeguards use inflatable boats or jet skis to reduce the time to reach a swimmer in distress. Inflatables are also used in conjunction with larger rescue craft, such as the Y class lifeboat used with the Tamar and Severn class lifeboats.

They are used in a number of sporting events and for recreational purposes, such as whitewater rafting, inflatable rescue boat racing, water skiing and fishing.

== Transportation ==
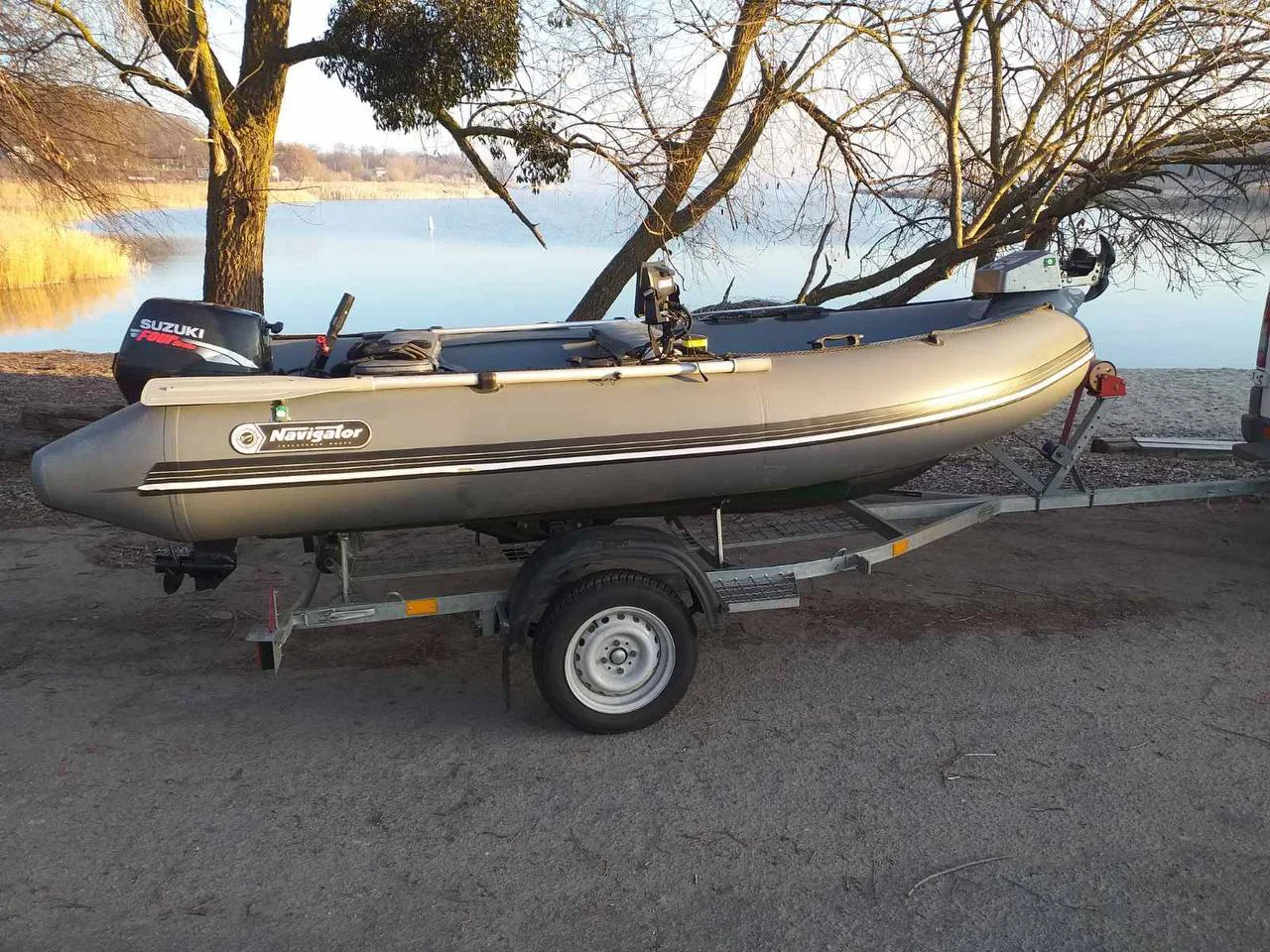
Inflatable boat on trailer

An inflatable boat can be transported in various ways:

Deflated and Packed: The most significant advantage of inflatable boats is their ability to be deflated, folded, and packed into a compact size. Once deflated, they can be stored in a carry bag and transported in the trunk of a car or the bed of a truck.

On a Trailer: If the inflatable boat is larger or if it has a hard bottom (like a RIB), it might be more convenient to transport it on a trailer. This is especially useful if the boat has an outboard motor attached.

On Roof Racks: Some individuals use roof racks on their vehicles to transport inflatable boats. The boat is either deflated and packed or partially inflated and secured on top of the car.

Using a Boat Dolly: For short distances, like moving the boat from a parking area to the water’s edge, a boat dolly or hand cart can be useful. These are especially handy for heavier inflatables or those with motors.

== See also ==
- Inflatable kayaks
- List of inflatable manufactured goods
