= LCRL =

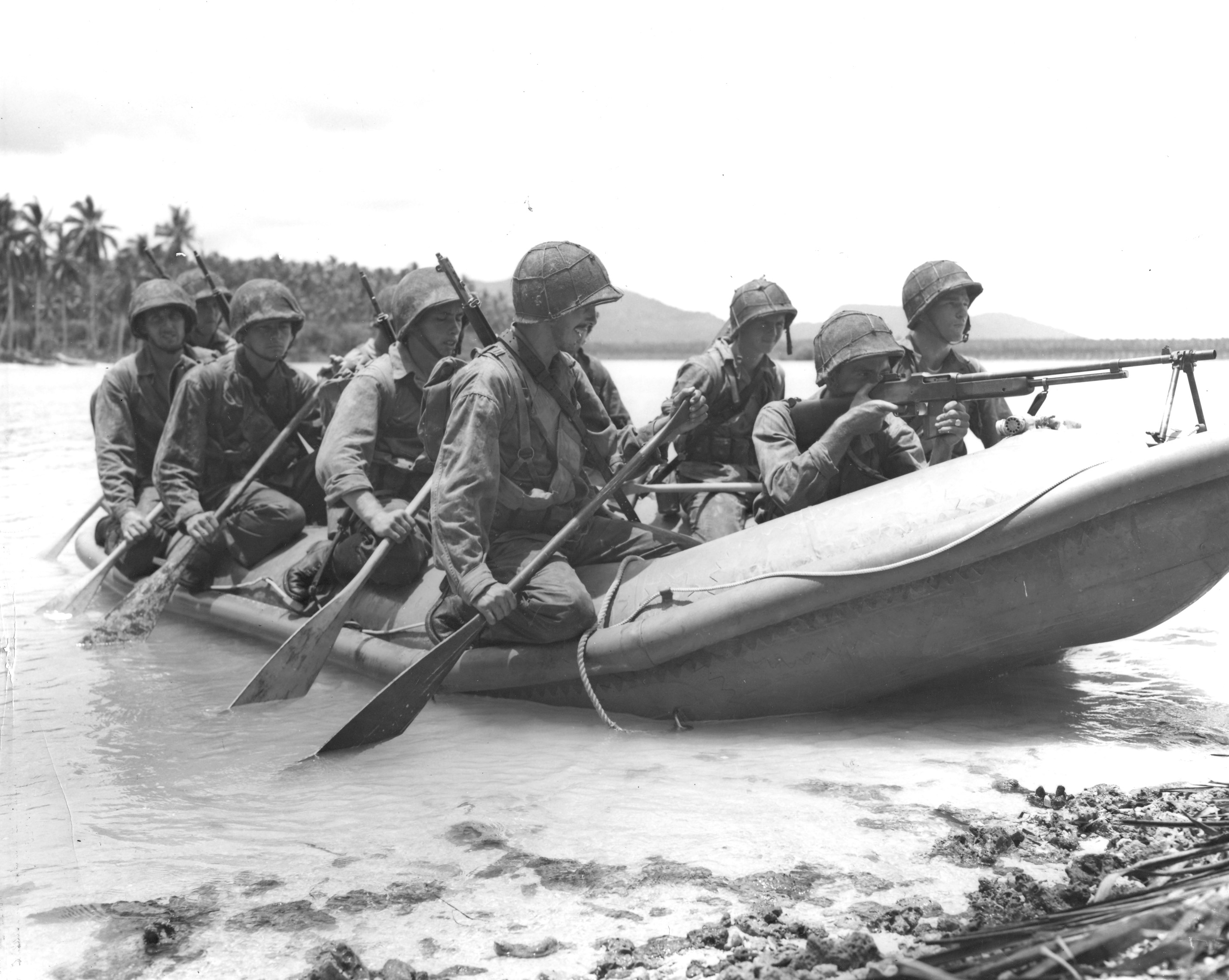
Marine Raiders landing on Pavuvu

The LCRL or LCR (L) (Landing Craft Rubber Large) was an inflatable boat which could carry ten men that was used by the United States Marine Corps and US Army from 1938 to 1945. 10,125 LCRLs were made during World War II. It had a weight of 320 pounds (150 kg) and measured 20 ft × 8 ft (5.5 m × 2.4 m). An outboard motor could be mounted if stealth was not needed. The LCRL had a mount for a .30 cal. machine gun. With no armor, LCRL were often used at night for Amphibious warfare. Most were built by the Goodyear Tire and Rubber Company. *

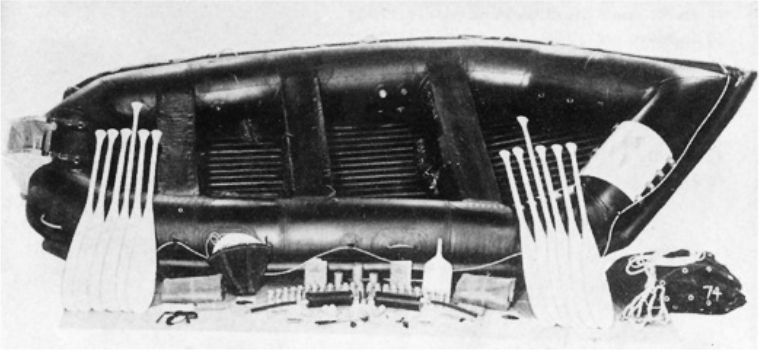
WWII rubber raiding craft

== See also ==
- Landing Craft Rubber Small
- Rigid-hulled inflatable boat
