= Observer Group =

Joint US Army & US Marine Corps amphibious reconnaissance unit (1941-1943

The Observer Group (precursor to Marine Corps Amphibious Reconnaissance Company and the Navy Scouts and Raiders) was a joint-United States Army/Marine Corps unit that was the first in the United States and Fleet Marine Force to be organized and trained specifically for amphibious reconnaissance. The Observer Group experimented in the methodology and equipment for projecting reconnaissance from the sea before the establishment of the OSS Maritime Unit, the Underwater Demolition Teams, and before the Army Special Forces and Air Commandos. It was also the birth of naval amphibious intelligence.

== Organization ==
On January 13, 1941, Major General Holland M. Smith relinquished command of 1st Marine Division and became Commanding General of I Corps (Provisional), U.S. Atlantic Fleet with Colonel Graves B. Erskine as his Chief of Staff. Throughout the year, the joint command, which was assembled together at Quantico, Virginia, was subsequently redesignated variously several times: Task Force 18, U.S. Atlantic Fleet; 1st Joint Training Force, U.S. Atlantic Fleet; Atlantic Amphibious Force; Amphibious Force, Atlantic Fleet; and finally Amphibious Corps, Atlantic Fleet. Colonel Erskine, under General Smith, was in charge of the Intelligence section jointly devised the plan in organizing a unit of men that were specialized in reconnoitering enemy shores for the upcoming mission of invading Europe and North Africa during World War II.

By December 1941, when the United States has entered the war, the joint unit was designated as the "Observer Group", which was composed of a small group of soldiers from the 1st Infantry Division and Marines from the First Marine Division; two officers and 22 enlisted men. The Marines were mostly from the 5th Marines' Battalion Intelligence (S-2) and Regiment Intelligence Sections (R-2), and the Division Intelligence Sections (G-2) of the 1st Marine Division. The Observer Group was led by 1st Lieutenant Lloyd Peddicord, Jr. of the United States Army and began to operate under the staff supervision of the Amphibious Corps, Atlantic Fleet G-2 by Army Lieutenant Colonel Louis Ely. Captain James Logan Jones Sr. was assigned to working under Colonel Erskine as the Assistant G-2 of the Intelligence section, under the Amphibious Corps staff, at the request of the Commanding General of Amphibious Force, Atlantic Fleet, Major General Holland Smith. Jones was fluent in several foreign languages, was extremely familiar with the target area of Africa; had experience with mechanical and mechanized vehicles and machinery, had experience in living in foreign lands, and had a military schooling and background. Because of these qualifications, he was assigned in February 1942 until September 1942, during which time he was promoted to Captain.

In August 1942, both the Army and Navy separated their joint effort and continued its planning for North Africa in Operation Torch. By September, the Navy established the Amphibious Scout and Raider School on NAB Little Creek, subsequently forming the Navy Scouts & Raiders unit. On 7 January 1943, the remaining Observer Group, with Captain James L. Jones Sr. commanding, formed the Amphibious Reconnaissance Company, Expeditionary Troops, Amphibious Corps Pacific Fleet (ACPF).

== Training ==
Most of the training was done on the Potomac, the Chesapeake Bay area (upper Chesapeake River and Norfolk), and NAB Little Creek, Virginia; and off the coast of Maryland, particularly St. Mary's and Solomon Island, which became their simulated battleground as squads attempted to scout each other's defenses. Submarine training took place at Naval Submarine Base New London, Connecticut in June 1942.

The Observer Group began to conduct reconnaissance exercises on both the Atlantic and the Caribbean, (just as the Fleet Marine Force's Fleet Landing Exercises had done a few years before) by the Marines' Platoon Sergeant Russell Corey. He trained the Observer Group in hands-on work at sea abroad fleet submarines and in the tower for instructions in the Momsen lung. Another Marine by the name of Sergeant Thomas L. Curtis was selected from the Observer Group and was sent to the United Kingdom to train with the British Royal Marines and subsequently was transferred to Office of Strategic Services (precursor to the Central Intelligence Agency).

They began experimenting in the methodology for launching reconnaissance from the sea and testing various equipment. Inflatable rubber boats were mostly used, although kayaks and canvas folding boats had been tested but were rejected. The determining criteria for boat selection was that recon boats needed to fit through the small hatches of fleet submarines while carrying weapons and equipment and be capable of handling related loads. Lt. Peddicord designed an inflatable boat and brought his plans to the Goodyear Tire and Rubber Company who produced the Landing Craft Rubber-Small craft able to hold seven men that was extensively used by the later Naval Combat Demolition Units.

The Marines were trained and taught knife fighting and escaping techniques in Shanghai by British Commando Instructor Lieutenant Colonel William E. Fairbairn, formerly an Inspector of the Shanghai Municipal Police. Fairbairn was one of the developers, along with another Inspector, Eric A. Sykes of the Fairbairn–Sykes fighting knife that was used by the Marine Recon units and later adopted by the Marine Raiders and the Paramarines during World War II. Around this time the Observer Group was sent to the School for the Federal Bureau of Investigation, which also shared the same base at Quantico, and were trained by FBI Agents for two weeks in the rudiments of jujitsu, pistol shooting from the hip, and operation of the Thompson submachine gun, or TSMG.

While the Observer Group was practicing their operational skills, the Intelligence Officers had worked out the tactical utilization of amphibious reconnaissance developing a new doctrine and organizational plan for the Fleet Marine Force. With the assignment to the United States Army of primary responsibility for the Atlantic (Amphibious Corps, Atlantic Fleet) and to the United States Navy of primary responsibility for the Pacific (the Amphibious Corps, Pacific Fleet), the joint command under General Smith divided as he relocated from Quantico to Camp Elliott, northeast of San Diego, California.
