= 4th Reconnaissance Battalion =

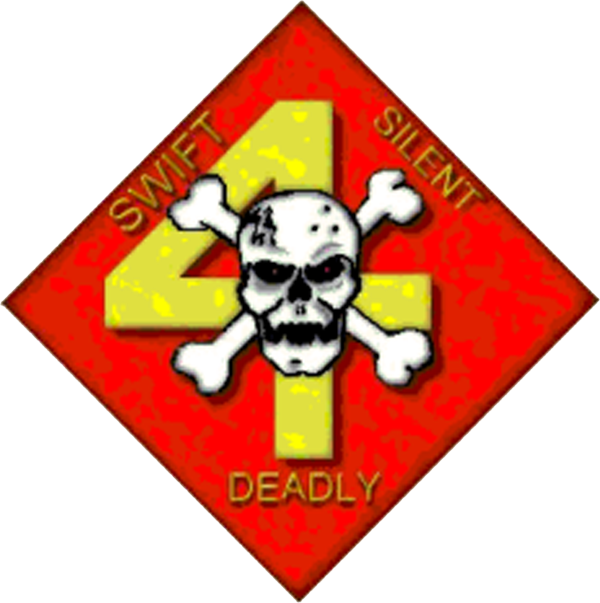
- 4th Reconnaissance Battalion insignia
- Active: 1943 – present
- Country: United States of America
- Branch: United States Marine Corps
- Type: Marine Division Reconnaissance
- Part of: Marine Forces Reserve; 4th Marine Division
- Garrison/HQ: Navy Reserve Center San Antonio, San Antonio, TX
- Patron: Major Anthony "Cold Steel" Walker
- Engagements: World War II: Battle of Kwajalein; Battle of Saipan; Battle of Tinian; Battle of Iwo Jima; Operation Desert Shield; Operation Desert Storm; Operation Iraqi Freedom; Operation Enduring Freedom

Commanders
- Current commander: LtCol Bryan Patterson

The 4th Reconnaissance Battalion is a reserve reconnaissance battalion in the United States Marine Corps. It falls under the 4th Marine Division and Marine Forces Reserve.

Between 1943 and 1945 during World War II the unit was designated Company D (Scout), 4th Tank Battalion of 4th Marine Division.

The unit was officially constituted in San Antonio, TX on 28 August 1948, as Company "C" of 20th Infantry Battalion. Since that time San Antonio area Marines have served variously as the 7th Rifle Company, 14th Infantry Battalion.

- The 4th Battalion designated on 1 July 1962.
- On 27 November 1990 the 4th Reconnaissance Battalion activated Company "D" in Albuquerque, NM, in support of Operation Desert Shield.
- In December 1990, Company "D" deployed to Saudi Arabia and eventually fought in Operation Desert Storm.
- Company "B", in Billings, MT was activated on 22 February 1991 and deployed to Marine Corps Base Camp Pendleton in California.
- The "San Antonio" companies of the 4th Reconnaissance Battalion were activated on 11 March 1991 and deployed to MCB Camp Pendleton, CA and MCB Camp Lejeune, NC.

== History ==
=== World War II ===
The unit fought in the Battle of Kwajalein, Battle of Saipan, Battle of Tinian and the Battle of Iwo Jima.

==== Eniwetok, February–March 1944 ====
The Planning for the seizure of Eniwetok began when the fighting was still taking place on Kwajalein. The D-Day for Eniwetok was scheduled for 17 February 1944. Eniwetok is made up of forty islets or more and was given the operation codename, DOWNSIDE. The preliminary pre-D-Day amphibious reconnaissance was performed by both Captain Edward Katzenbach's designated 4th Marine Division's Company D (Scout), 4th Tank Battalion, and Captain James Jones's Amphibious Reconnaissance Company of the V Amphibious Corps.

The landing plan encompassed four phases, on D-Day, three islets in the north of the atoll were to be seized. Two were to be used for artillery bases, Aistu and Rujioru—codenamed CAMELIA and CANNA. Bogen Island, or ZINNIA, lies north of the islet of Engebi (FRAGILE). ZINNIA was tasked to be seized by Katzenbach's 4th Division Scouts while Jones's company was ordered to recon and seize CAMELIA and CANNA. Katzenbach and his scouts fought the heavy surf and fierce 25-knot winds, which instead forced them to land on an island next to ZINNIA. By 0327 on D+1, the scout Marines crossed over to Bogen and declared it secured.

General Thomas E. Watson, assistant division commander of 4th Marine Division, ordered both the amphib recon and scout companies to continue reconnoitering, seizing and clearing other islands in the atoll, moving south toward the islet of Japtan, or LADYSLIPPER. While VAC Amphib Recon Company were operating on Parry island, or LILAC, in the eastern-side, Katzenbach's Scouts were clearing the islands and coral outcroppings on the western-side of DOWNSIDE. Once Katzenbach reached the larger islet of Rigii (POSY), 20 miles west of LILAC, and were engaged by hostile fire from the Japanese defenders; the scouts killed nine Japanese before declaring POSY secured.

After the seizure of both Aitsu and Rujioru, artillery emplaced on the two islands and were used in fire support for the occupation landing forces on Engebi, or FRAGILE. General Watson attached the 2nd Separate Tank Company from 22nd Marines and Captains Jones's and Katzenbach's recon and scout companies to the Army 106th Infantry Regiment (less 2nd Battalion) and designated the reinforced unit as 3rd Battalion, 106th Infantry (3/106) as reserve.

At 0908, the Marines hit the beach for the main assault of 1st and 2nd Battalions of 22nd Marine Regiment. Third Battalion were called in early to follow in trace. At 1230, both the VAC Amphib Recon Company and 4th Division Scout Company were ordered to augmented the 22nd Marines. Jones's company reported to 1st Battalion and Katzenbach's company reported to 2nd Battalion, both landing at 1320. On 23 February 1944, the Eniwetok Atoll was declared secured, closing Operation DOWNSIDE.

==== Saipan, June 1944 ====
Company D (Scout) performed a series of special missions with 2nd Marine Division's scout company, that included a recon detachment with 1st Battalion, 29th Marine Regiment (1/29). Seizing the summit of Mount Tapochau later repulsed a Japanese counterattack on that highest point of Saipan.

==== Iwo Jima, February 1945 ====
Before the operations of Iwo Jima, two officers and twenty enlisted scout-recon Marines from the scout and sniper platoons of 4th and 5th Marine Division and three amphib recon Marines from Company B of VAC Amphib Recon Battalion, FMFPAC were detached to composite together a "provisional amphibious reconnaissance group" made up of recon Marines and four Underwater Demolition Teams (#12, #13, #14 and #15). The reason was to expedite the passage and briefing of raw beach and enemy information to their own respective parent operations (S-3) and intelligence (S-2) staffs. Embarking on USS Blessman (DE-69) the augmented recon and UDT team, along with the four UDTs embarked on high-speed transport ships USS Bull (DE-693), USS Bates (DE-68), and USS Barr (DE-576), and headed to Iwo Jima, arriving just off the eastern beaches of Iwo Jima on the morning of 17 February 1945, two days prior to D-Day (D-2).

Naval gunfire support commenced from battleships USS Idaho (BB-42), USS Nevada (BB-36) and USS Tennessee (BB-43) and by 1025, Admiral William Blandy ordered the fire-support battleships to retire and clear the approach lanes for the UDT and recon Marines. The UDT and Marines were tasked with taking photographs of the beaches and enemy defenses, if possible. At 1100, the four APDs slowed and dropped the Higgins boats, launching their rubber boats. While they made their preliminary landing toward shore, they immediately encountered enemy fire. Evading fire, they made their way to the beachhead, every one of the twelve landing personnel carriers were either hit or sinking. After completing their photo reconnaissance, they made their way on the remaining landing craft still floatable and returned to the APDs.

=== Korean War ===
In 1950, with the outbreak of the Korean War the Marine Corps Reserve was activated. San Antonio Marines joined the mobilization via troop train to Marine Corps Base Camp Pendleton, California in July 1950.

=== Interim years ===
February 1991—March 1991, the Marines of 4th Reconnaissance Battalion volunteered for extended active duty in support of three counter-narcotic operations under the control of Joint Task Force Six headquarters in El Paso, TX.

=== Operation Iraqi Freedom ===
Marines from 4th Reconnaissance Battalion have served multiple combat tours in support of Operation Iraqi Freedom supporting active-duty Force Reconnaissance units and Division-level reconnaissance units. In 2003 Delta Company, attached to 1st Recon Battalion, was one of the first Marine Units in many parts of Iraq. The Battalion acted as the Spear head for the 1st Marine Division spawning the book and HBO Show "Generation Kill". Charlie Company augmented 2nd Force Reconnaissance Company, II Marine Expeditionary Force in support of Task Force Tarawa. Charlie Company lead reconnaissance efforts through the initial invasion of Iraq, during the Battle of An Nasiriyah, the Jessica Lynch rescue, and initial movements to secure Baghdad and Al-Kut. In 2004, Bravo Company, attached to 2nd Reconnaissance Battalion, participated in the Second Battle of Fallujah. In 2005 Headquarters and Service Company augmented 3d Battalion, 25th Marines in Al Anbar. In 2006 and 2007, 4th Reconnaissance Battalion headquarters and platoons operated as an independent command in support of Regimental Combat Team 7 in Iraq's Al Anbar Province. Detachment 4th Force Reconnaissance Company 4th Marine Division

== Structure ==
Unit	Location
Headqurters & Services Company	San Antonio, Texas
Company A	Alameda, California
Company B	Smyrna, Georgia
Company C	San Antonio, Texas
Force Reconnaissance Company	Mobile, Alabama

The battalion has broken ground in Marseilles, Illinois for a new Reserve Training Center which will be ready by 2010.

== See also ==
- List of United States Marine Corps battalions
- Organization of the United States Marine Corps
