= Richard Bull =

Richard Bull may refer to:

- Richard Bull (actor) (1924–2014), American actor
- Richard Bull (aviator) (1914–1942), U.S. naval officer
- Richard S. Bull (1913–1942), U.S. naval officer, also an aviator
  - USS Richard S. Bull, a John C. Butler-class destroyer escort in the United States Navy
- Richard Bull (Australian politician) (born 1946), New South Wales politician
- Richard Bull (MP) (1721–1805), British politician
