= USS Bull =

Two ships of the United States Navy have been assigned the name Bull, in honor of Lieutenant (junior grade) Richard Bull (1914–1942).

- USS Bull (DE-52), a Buckley-class destroyer escort, transferred before launching in February 1943 to the Royal Navy, in which she served as HMS Bentinck. She was returned to the United States and struck in 1946.
- USS Bull (DE-693), a Buckley-class destroyer escort, launched in March 1943 and struck in 1966. She was sold to the Republic of China where she served as the ROCS Lu Shan (PF-36), until she was scrapped in 1995.

== See also ==
- USS Richard S. Bull (DE-402), a John C. Butler-class destroyer escort named for Ensign Richard S. Bull (1913–1942), which was launched in November 1943 and struck in 1968.
