= USS Rich =

USS Rich may refer to the following ships of the United States Navy:

- USS Rich (DE-695), a Buckley-class destroyer escort launched in 1943 and sunk off Utah Beach in 1944
- USS Rich (DD-820), a Gearing-class destroyer launched in 1945 and struck in 1977
