= USS Bull (DE-693) =

Buckley-class destroyer escort

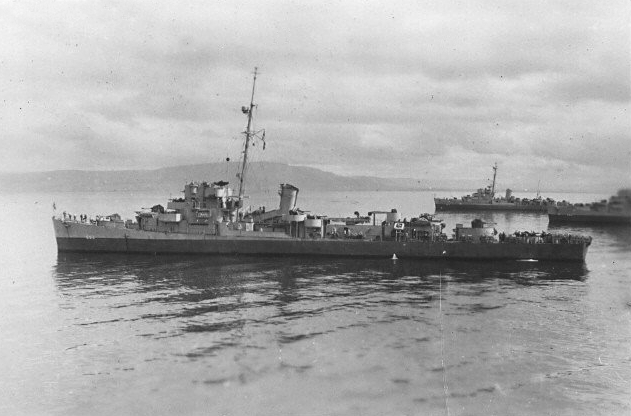

History

United States
- Name: USS Bull (DE-693)
- Namesake: Richard Bull
- Ordered: 9 October 1942
- Builder: Defoe Shipbuilding Company, Bay City, Michigan
- Laid down: 15 December 1942 as Buckley-class destroyer escort
- Launched: 23 March 1943
- Commissioned: 12 August 1943
- Reclassified: APD-78, 31 July 1944
- Decommissioned: 5 June 1947
- Stricken: 15 June 1966
- Honors and awards: 3 battle stars (World War II)
- Fate: Sold to Taiwan, 12 July 1966

History

Taiwan
- Name: ROCS Lu Shan (DE-36)
- Acquired: 12 July 1966
- Reclassified: PF-36
- Reclassified: PF-821
- Reclassified: PF-836
- Stricken: May 1995
- Fate: Broken up for scrap

General characteristics
- Class & type: Buckley-class destroyer escort
- Displacement: 1,400 long tons (1,422 t) light; 1,673 long tons (1,700 t) standard
- Length: 306 ft (93 m)
- Beam: 37 ft (11 m)
- Draft: 13 ft 6 in (4.11 m)
- Propulsion: 2 × boilers; General Electric turbo-electric drive; 12,000 shp (8.9 MW); 2 × solid manganese-bronze 3,600 lb (1,600 kg) 3-bladed propellers, 8 ft 6 in (2.59 m) diameter, 7 ft 7 in (2.31 m) pitch; 2 × rudders
- Speed: 24 knots (44 km/h; 28 mph)
- Boats & landing craft carried: 4 × LCVP landing craft (as APD)
- Capacity: 162 troops (as APD)
- Complement: 186
- Armament: As DE : 3 × 3"/50 caliber guns; 1 × quad 1.1"/75 caliber gun; 8 × single 20 mm guns; 1 × triple 21 inch (533 mm) torpedo tubes; 8 × K-gun depth charge projectors; 2 × depth charge tracks; As APD : 1 × 5"/38 caliber gun; 3 × twin 40 mm guns; 6 × single 20 mm guns; 2 × depth charge tracks

USS Bull (DE-693/APD-78) was a Buckley-class destroyer escort, later converted to a Charles Lawrence-class high speed transport. She was the second Navy ship named after Lieutenant (junior grade) Richard Bull (1914–1942), a naval aviator who was posthumously awarded the Distinguished Flying Cross.

Bull was the first of many destroyer escorts built at Defoe Shipbuilding Company, of Bay City, Michigan. The hull of Bull was constructed in the conventional fashion while the jigs and fittings were constructed in order to build the rest of the ships in a new upside-down method that Defoe pioneered. Bull was launched on 25 March 1943 at the Defoe yard; sponsored by Mrs. Ruth P. Bull, widow of Lt.(jg) Bull. She was commissioned 12 August 1943.

== USS Bull (DE-693) ==
Following her shakedown training out of Bermuda, Bull escorted the Army transport USAT George Washington to Norfolk, Virginia, and then continued on to Boston, Massachusetts, where she arrived on 4 October 1943 for post-shakedown availability. The destroyer escort touched briefly at New York City; proceeded thence to Curaçao, in the Dutch West Indies, and then headed across the Atlantic to Derry, Northern Ireland, on her first convoy-escort mission. Following her return to New York on 9 December, Bull operated out of Cape Cod Bay through the end of 1943 with Fleet Air, Atlantic, towing targets used by Navy planes practicing radar and dive-bombing tactics.

Bull was then assigned to Escort Division 19 (CortDiv 19); at this time, consisting of the destroyer escorts Bull, Rich, Bunch, Bates, Amesbury, and Blessman. Bull returned to New York on 3 January 1944 where she joined Task Group 21.9 (TG 21.9) and headed back to Derry on 9 January. She reached that port 10 days later and remained there for a little over a week. After putting to sea again on 27 January bound for New York, the warship encountered heavy seas a day out of port and began shipping a lot of water. Some of the water found its way into her number two engine room through an exhaust blower duct, which shorted out a circuit and caused a fire. Fortunately, her crewmen put out the blaze before it caused serious damage. While the destroyer escort battled her way through a hurricane on 3 February, ammunition tumbled from storage racks that had been torn loose by the storm and caused a few anxious moments before it was battened down. High winds and heavy seas also loosened the grips holding the ship's motor whaleboat in place and jostled the foremast so much so that it required a strengthening jury rig. Finally the storm-battered warship reached New York on 9 February.

Following an availability at New York, Bull conducted refresher training out of Casco Bay, Maine, before proceeding to Boston to pick up another transatlantic convoy. Departing Boston on 28 February, she shepherded her charges across the U-boat-infested ocean to Belfast, Northern Ireland, where she arrived on 8 March. She returned to New York on 25 March, she conducted one additional round-trip transatlantic convoy escort cycle that spring and returned to Boston on 1 May.

After an availability at the New York Navy Yard, she escorted one additional convoy to England between 12 and 23 May, and remained in the British Isles with the naval forces gathering for the cross-channel invasion of France. Instead of supporting the landings on Normandy's beaches, however, Bull joined the escort of a convoy back to the United States. Bull escorted one more convoy to England and then returned to the United States with TG 21.9 in July. On 24 July 1944, while en route to New York, the destroyer escort picked up what she interpreted as submarine noises and promptly sent depth charges and hedgehog projectiles into the depths from which the sounds had come. No evidence of a "kill" appeared after the attack, so the destroyer escort rejoined her charges and reached New York with them on 27 July.

== USS Bull (APD-78) ==
Mooring at the Todd Shipyards Corp. the next day, Bull began her conversion to a fast transport. Redesignated APD-78 on 31 July 1944 and reconfigured to berth troops amidships and to carry their associated gear, the warship lost her "main battery" of three 3-inch (76 mm) guns and received a single 5-inch (130 mm) gun, in an enclosed mount forward. Newer, heavier 40 mm Bofors anti-aircraft guns replaced the older 1.1-inch (28 mm) mount.

Getting underway in her new guise on 26 October 1944 and heading for Norfolk, Bull carried out her shakedown training in the Chesapeake Bay region under the aegis of the Amphibious Training Forces, Atlantic Fleet. After clearing the Virginia Capes on 7 November, the warship transited the Panama Canal on 13 November and proceeded – via San Diego and San Pedro, California – to Pearl Harbor. There, she embarked Underwater Demolition Team-14 (UDT-14) on 7 December and sailed four days later, via Eniwetok and Ulithi, to the Palaus, the staging area for the invasion of Luzon. Bull sortied on New Year's Day 1945 with the beach demolition group. Proceeding via the Surigao Strait, Mindanao Sea, and the South China Sea to Lingayen Gulf, the fast transport and her companions suffered nearly continuous attacks by Japanese kamikaze planes bent on destroying themselves and their targets. On "S 2" day, Bull provided fire support for the reconnaissance of the San Fabian sector of Lingayen Gulf, earning praise from the commander of her embarked UDT for her "excellent and accurate" gunfire that kept enemy fire to a minimum. During her time in Lingayen Gulf, Bull experienced some "close shaves". On one occasion, antiaircraft fire slapped down a suicider bent on crashing her just 20 yards (18 m) short of her side. Another time, a bomb landed less than 200 yards (180 m) away on her starboard quarter.

While retiring from Lingayen Gulf to Leyte as part of Task Unit 77.15.5 (TU 77.15.5), Bull watched an American plane crash on nearby Siguijori Island thought to be occupied by the Japanese. Detached to rescue the pilot, Bull, guided by two Vought F4Us, proceeded to the area and found the plane 50 yards (46 m) off the beach on the northwest side of the island. Sending armed landing parties in two of her boats, Bull soon spotted crowds of native Filipinos coming out to greet the American sailors. The fast transport's men quickly learned that Filipino forces had driven the Japanese invaders from the island in November. She took the injured pilot on board, treated his wounds, and then sent him off in a PBY.

After a brief stop at Leyte, Bull reached Ulithi to prepare for the invasion of Iwo Jima. On 10 February 1945, she cleared the Carolines as part of TG 52.4, the Underwater Demolition Group of the Amphibious Support Force, Task Force 52 (TF 52). She headed, via Saipan, to Iwo Jima and arrived there three days before the landing. Bull took part in the reconnaissance of both preferred and alternate beaches and drew Japanese fire several times, yet she escaped without damage on each occasion, despite several near misses. After "D day", Bull operated as a screening vessel, while her embarked UDT cleared beaches to facilitate the landing of supplies. Although the ship's company suffered no casualties, one of UDT-14's officers was killed when a Japanese shore battery sank the LCI in which he had embarked for gunfire spotting.

Leaving Iwo Jima on 5 March, Bull headed for Ulithi to make ready for the next major American amphibious assault: the invasion of Okinawa. She arrived off that island on 26 March and, but for short runs to Saipan for upkeep, remained there until after all organized Japanese resistance had been wiped out some three months later. Her principal duties during the campaign were to support beach reconnaissance and to screen other Allied ships. While off Okinawa, she endured countless air raids, but no bullet or bomb ever touched her. On 4 June, while returning from Saipan, Bull encountered the fringes of a typhoon, which prompted the convoy to reverse course. Despite the course change, the ships in the formation experienced 70 knot (130 km/h) winds and mountainous seas. The storm subsided by mid afternoon; and, with no ships reporting any damage, the group resumed its course to Okinawa and arrived there on 8 June. Bull spent the rest of June on a screening station near Okinawa before sailing for Guam on 1 July. Continuing thence via Eniwetok and Pearl Harbor, the fast transport reached San Pedro, California, where she conducted voyage repairs, refresher training, and UDT rehearsals for the invasion of the Japan.

However, Japan's capitulation changed Bull's next mission from invasion to occupation. After moving from San Pedro to San Diego in mid-August 1945, she sailed for the Marianas on 6 September and reached Guam on 2 October 1945. Over the next few months, the fast transport operated in the Philippine Islands, under the control of Commander, Philippine Sea Frontier. Her ports of call included: Manila, Samar, Leyte, Subic Bay, and Manus in the Admiralties. She also visited Okinawa and made three voyages to China. Ending her shuttle service in the Far East, she departed Shanghai late in April 1946 and reached Pearl Harbor on 2 May. Three days later, she sailed with Raymon W. Herndon for southern California.

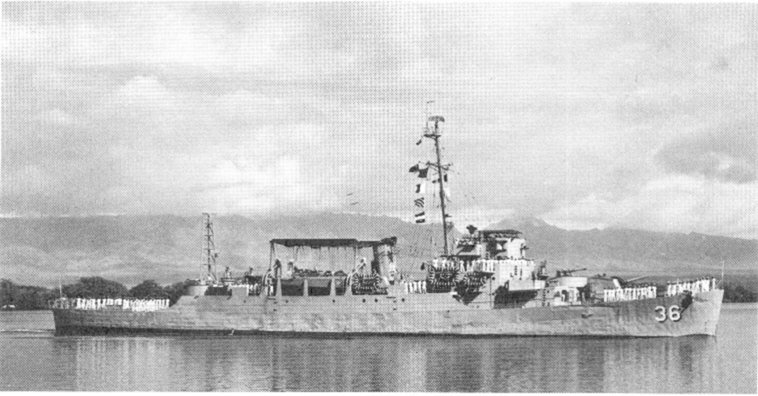
Bull in Chinese service as Lu Shan (PF-36).

Bull was decommissioned at San Diego on 5 June 1947 and was placed in the Pacific Reserve Fleet there on 16 June. There, she remained for almost two decades. Her name was struck from the Navy List on 15 June 1966.

== ROCS Lu Shan (PF-36) ==
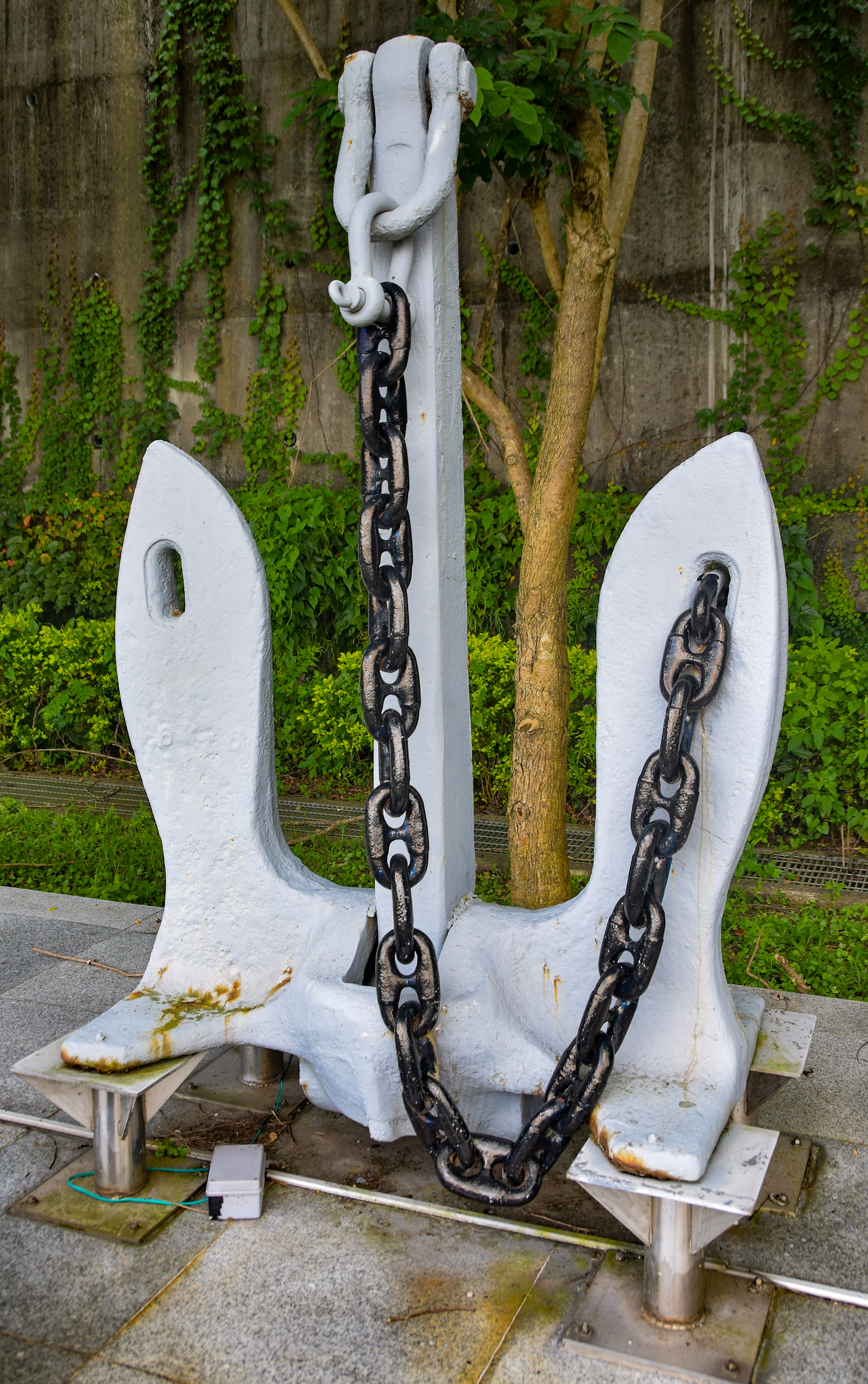
The Anchor of USS Bull on display at the New Taipei City Weapon Park

She was sold to Taiwan on 12 July 1966. The ship served in the Republic of China Navy as ROCS Lu Shan (PF-36). Lu Shan was struck by the Taiwanese Navy in May 1995 and broken up for scrap.

One of her anchor is on display at the New Taipei City Weapon Park (新北市武器公園).

== Awards ==
Bull received three battle stars for her World War II service.
