= USS Amesbury =

Buckley-class destroyer escort

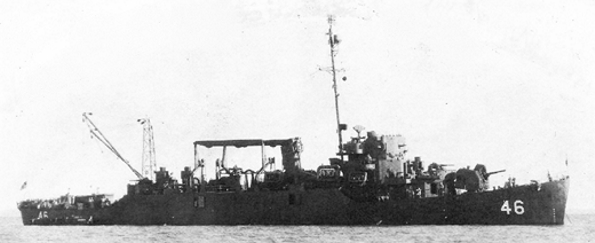
- USS Amesbury after conversion to APD-46, in 1945

History

United States
- Name: USS Amesbury
- Ordered: 1942
- Builder: Bethlehem Hingham Shipyard
- Laid down: 8 March 1943
- Launched: 5 June 1943
- Commissioned: 30 August 1943
- Decommissioned: 3 July 1946
- Reclassified: APD-46, 23 February 1945
- Stricken: 1 June 1960
- Honors and awards: 1 battle star (World War II)
- Fate: Sold for scrap, 24 October 1962; Sank under tow off Key West

General characteristics
- Class & type: Buckley-class destroyer escort
- Displacement: 1,400 long tons (1,422 t) light; 1,740 long tons (1,768 t) standard
- Length: 306 ft (93 m)
- Beam: 37 ft (11 m)
- Draft: 9 ft 6 in (2.90 m) standard; 11 ft 3 in (3.43 m) full load
- Propulsion: 2 × boilers; General Electric turbo-electric drive; 12,000 shp (8.9 MW); 2 × solid manganese-bronze 3,600 lb (1,600 kg) 3-bladed propellers, 8 ft 6 in (2.59 m) diameter, 7 ft 7 in (2.31 m) pitch; 2 × rudders; 359 tons fuel oil
- Speed: 23 knots (43 km/h; 26 mph)
- Range: 3,700 nmi (6,900 km) at 15 kn (28 km/h; 17 mph); 6,000 nmi (11,000 km) at 12 kn (22 km/h; 14 mph)
- Complement: 15 officers, 198 men
- Armament: 3 × 3-inch/50-caliber guns; 1 × quad 1.1-inch/75-caliber gun; 8 × single 20 mm guns; 1 × triple 21 inch (533 mm) torpedo tubes; 1 × Hedgehog anti-submarine mortar; 8 × K-gun depth charge projectors; 2 × depth charge tracks

USS Amesbury (DE-66/APD-46), a Buckley-class destroyer escort of the United States Navy, was named in honor of Lieutenant (jg) Stanton Morgan Amesbury (1916–1942), who was killed in action while flying from the aircraft carrier Ranger (CV-4) during Operation Torch in 1942.

Amesbury was laid down on 8 March 1943 at Hingham, Massachusetts, by the Bethlehem-Hingham Shipyard; launched on 6 June 1943, sponsored by Mrs. Janet Kenney Amesbury, the widow of Lieutenant (jg.) Amesbury; and commissioned on 31 August 1943.

== Service history ==
=== Convoy escort, 1943–1944 ===
Upon the completion of her shakedown training at Bermuda and of post-shakedown availability at the Boston Navy Yard, Amesbury proceeded to Norfolk, Virginia, where, until 13 November she served as a unit of the destroyer escort (DE) pre-commissioning training detail, used for the instruction of future DE sailors.

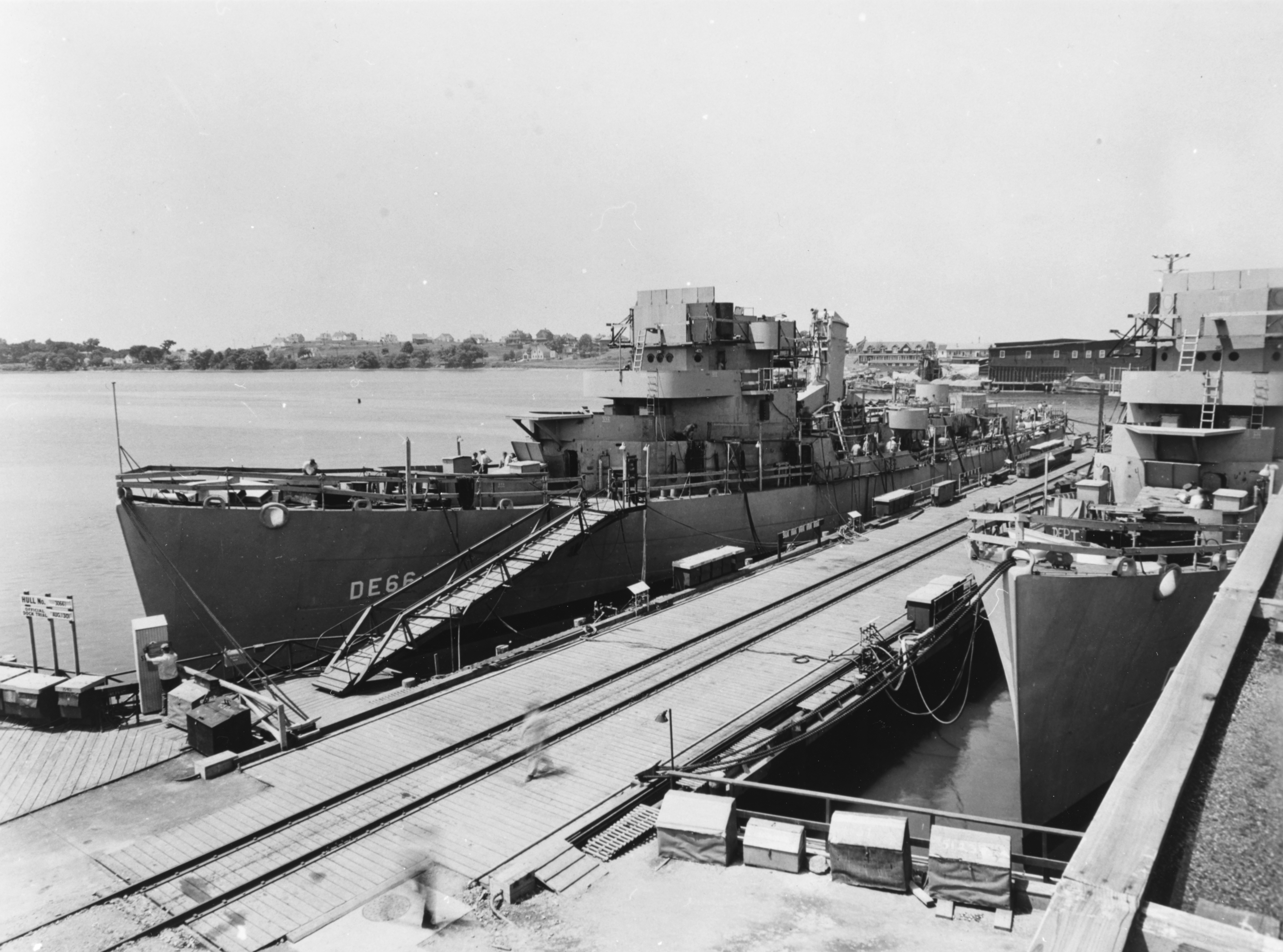
Amesbury fitting out in 1943.

One week later, on 20 November, Amesbury commenced operation with Task Force 69 on trans-Atlantic convoy escort runs and later joined Task Group (TG) 21.9 in similar work. She operated in this capacity through the spring of 1943. During this time, she served as flagship for Commander, Escort Division 19, commanded by Commander H. W. Howe, on four round-trip voyages to Londonderry, Northern Ireland, and one to Greenock, Scotland. At this time, CortDiv 19 consisted of the destroyer escorts Amesbury, Bull, Bunch, Rich, Bates, and Blessman. On 10 May 1944, Amesbury's captain "fleeted up" to ComCortDiv 19, relieving CDR Howe, and LCDR Arthur B. Wilber, USNR, assumed command of the ship.

=== Invasion of Normandy, 1944 ===
At Londonderry on 1 June 1944, Amesbury reported for duty with TF 124, TG 124.7 and, two days later, sailed to take part in the invasion of Normandy. Arriving in the assault area on 6 June, she took up her assigned area on a screen and fire support station in the "Mason Dixie" grid. During the next week on station, Amesbury took part in several anti-aircraft actions against attacking German planes bedeviling the ships offshore.

Between air attacks and drifting mines, the work of the escorts was brisk. At 2112 on 11 June, LST-496 struck a mine while proceeding in convoy through a channel to the assault area, and Amesbury hastened to her assistance. Three smaller craft arrived on the scene and were busily picking up survivors before the destroyer escort reached the tank landing ship's side. As soon as PC-568 cleared LST-496, LCDR Wilber skillfully maneuvered Amesbury alongside the stricken amphibious ship and moored her to remove the remainder of the LST's crew and embarked troops, summoning a doctor from LCI-530 to treat the injured men taken on board.

Meanwhile, the tug ATA-125 arrived on the scene and, with the assistance of Amesbury's sailors on board LST-496, secured a tow line to the crippled ship. However, a short time later, LST-496, barely underway, began to capsize to port. Amesbury promptly cut her lines and maneuvered to clear, the sailors she had put on board the doomed ship to handle the lines being ordered off. Lieutenant H. J. Riley, USNR, in charge of Amesbury's detail, made certain that all of his men were safely away before he jumped to safety. Ultimately, all of the destroyer escort's sailors were picked up, uninjured, but the ship they had attempted to salvage soon sank.

Amesbury returned to Plymouth, England, the next day, 12 June and got underway for New York on 13 June. Resuming her duties with CortDiv 19, the ship made one round-trip voyage between New York and Ireland in July.

=== Return to US waters and conversion, 1944–1945 ===
On 4 August, with the dissolution of CortDiv 19, Amesbury sailed for Panama as relief for the destroyer Clark (DD-361). Diverted while en route, to Key West, Florida, Amesbury reported to Commander, TG 23.3 for temporary duty. From that time until 20 February 1945, the destroyer escort was assigned to the Fleet Sonar School squadron, operating daily from Key West within the limits of assigned operating areas in the Straits of Florida, in connection with training in anti-submarine warfare.

Amesbury arrived at the Philadelphia Navy Yard on 23 February, was redesignated APD-46 on that day, and remained there until 16 May 1945 while undergoing conversion to a Charles Lawrence-class high speed transport. Amesbury got underway from Norfolk for the west coast and, after proceeding via the Panama Canal, reached San Diego on 17 June. Following a brief visit to Hawaii, the ship returned from Pearl Harbor to the west coast to conduct sonar exercises with the West Coast Sonar School and gunnery and shakedown training with the San Diego Shakedown Group into mid-August as the war ended in the Pacific.

=== Post-war Pacific operations, 1945 ===
With the 11 officers and 81 enlisted men of Underwater Demolition Team 12 embarked, Amesbury sailed for Okinawa on 16 August. After tarrying briefly at Pearl Harbor and in the western Pacific en route, the ship arrived at Okinawa on 4 September. She sortied the next day as part of Task Unit (TU) 78.1.15 for Jinsen (now Inchon) Korea to support the unfolding occupation of that region. Remaining in the area until 15 September, Amesbury acted as screening vessel for the anchorage while UDT-12 conducted beach reconnaissance.

After a quick return to Okinawa, Amesbury proceeded to Tientsin, China, on 25 September, where she supported the landings at that north Chinese port. She departed Chinese waters on 4 October with a group of tank landing ships, bound for Okinawa. En route, she destroyed three mines, a derelict Chinese junk, and successfully rode out a typhoon.

Sailing for Guam on 22 October, Amesbury embarked 37 Marines for passage back home and, in company with Balduck (APD-132), proceeded via Eniwetok and Pearl Harbor, on to the United States arriving at San Diego on 7 November. After embarking Army passengers, Amesbury sailed for the east coast on 7 December and reached Norfolk soon thereafter. After disembarking her passengers and discharging ammunition and other stores, she proceeded to Green Cove Springs, Florida, for lay-up in the Florida Group 16th Fleet.

=== Decommissioning and sale ===
Decommissioned and placed in reserve on 3 July 1946, Amesbury never again performed active service. Stricken from the Naval Vessel Register on 1 June 1960, Amesbury was sold to Chet Alexander Marine Salvage of Key West, Florida, on 24 October 1962. Her hulk sank approximately 5 nautical miles (5.8 mi; 9.3 km) west of Key West while under tow, and now rests in 25 feet (7.6 m) of water at 24°36.970′N 81°58.910′W.

== Awards ==
Amesbury earned one battle star for her World War II service off the Normandy beachhead.
