= USS Rich (DE-695) =

Buckley-class destroyer escort

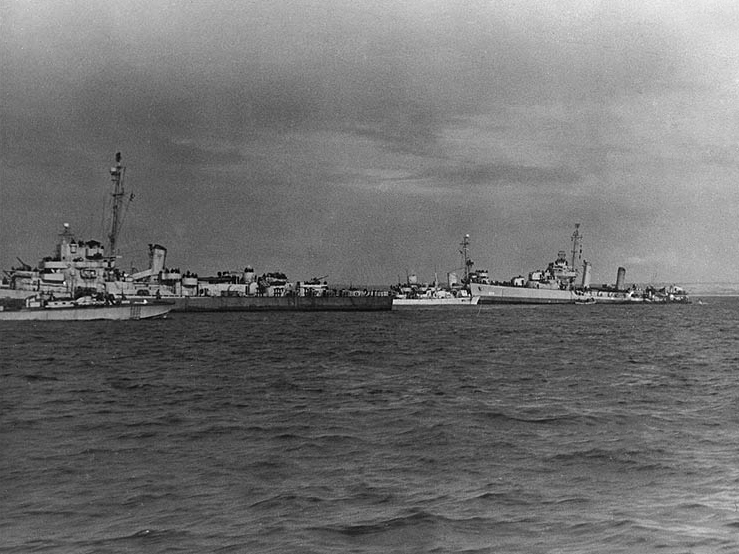
- USS Rich, left, shortly before being mined, 1944

History

United States
- Name: USS Rich
- Namesake: Ralph M. Rich
- Ordered: 1942
- Builder: Defoe Shipbuilding Company, Bay City, Michigan
- Laid down: 27 March 1943
- Launched: 22 June 1943
- Commissioned: 1 October 1943
- Honors and awards: 1 battle star (World War II)
- Fate: Sunk by mines, 8 June 1944

General characteristics
- Class & type: Buckley-class destroyer escort
- Displacement: 1,400 long tons (1,422 t) (standard); 1,740 long tons (1,768 t) (full load)
- Length: 306 ft (93 m)
- Beam: 37 ft (11 m)
- Draft: 9 ft 6 in (2.90 m) standard; 11 ft 3 in (3.43 m) full load
- Installed power: 12,000 shp (8,900 kW)
- Propulsion: General Electric turbo-electric drive; 2 × solid manganese-bronze 3,600 lb (1,600 kg) 3-bladed propellers, 8 ft 6 in (2.59 m) diameter, 7 ft 7 in (2.31 m) pitch; 2 × rudders
- Speed: 23 kn (26 mph; 43 km/h)
- Range: 3,700 nmi (4,300 mi; 6,900 km) at 15 kn (17 mph; 28 km/h); 6,000 nmi (6,900 mi; 11,000 km) at 12 kn (14 mph; 22 km/h)
- Capacity: 359 tons fuel oil
- Complement: 15 officers, 198 men
- Armament: 3 × 3 in (76 mm)/50 cals dual purpose guns, 4 × 1.1 in (28 mm)/75 cal anti-aircraft guns (4×1), 8 × 20 mm cannons, 9 × 21 inch (533 mm) torpedo tubes (3×3), 1 × Hedgehog anti-submarine mortar, 8 × K-gun depth charge projectors, 2 × depth charge tracks

USS Rich (DE-695) was a Buckley-class destroyer escort, the first United States Navy ship named in honor of Lieutenant (j.g.) Ralph M. Rich (1916–1942) who was awarded the Navy Cross for his leadership as a fighter pilot off Enterprise during the Battle of Midway.

== Building and commissioning ==
Rich was laid down on 27 March 1943 at the Defoe Shipbuilding Company, Bay City, Michigan, the third destroyer escort to be built at that yard. She was launched on 22 June 1943, sponsored by Mrs. Ralph McMaster Rich, widow of Lt. Rich. Builder's trials before her pre-commissioning cruise were done in Lake Huron.

After completion, Rich sailed from the builder's yard at Bay City to Chicago, Illinois, where they arrived on 24 September. From there, they went through the Chicago Sanitary and Ship Canal and down the Chicago River to Joliet, Illinois, where pontoons were attached to the ship so it could be pushed down the Des Plaines River, Illinois River, and Mississippi River as part of a barge train. After arriving at the Todd Johnson Shipyard in Algiers, Louisiana, on the west bank of the Mississippi at New Orleans, the rest of the crew reported aboard, and Rich was commissioned on 1 October 1943.

== World War II ==
Following shakedown off Bermuda, Rich was primarily engaged in coastal escort and patrol duty with Escort Division 19 (CortDiv 19) until the end of February 1944. At this time, CortDiv 19 consisted of the destroyer escorts Rich, Bull, Bunch, Bates, Amesbury, and Blessman. Then assigned to trans-Atlantic escort work, she completed three round-trip crossings by May. On 10 May 1944, Rich departed New York City in escort of a convoy to Britain in what would be her last transit of the North Atlantic.

On 23 May, she arrived at Derry, Northern Ireland, and awaited a convoy to escort back to the United States. Instead, Rich was assigned to the Normandy Invasion force, and commenced preparations for "Operation Neptune", the naval phase of the invasion of Normandy. She arrived at Plymouth, England on 4 June, and was assigned as an escort to the battleship Nevada.

Delayed by weather for 24 hours, the "U" force sailed for France on 5 June, with Rich and her sister ship Bates in the screen of the bombardment group of Task Force 125 (TF 125), which consisted of the battleship Nevada and the heavy cruisers Quincy (CA-71), Tuscaloosa, and HMS Black Prince. From 6–8 June, she screened the heavier units as they supplied gunfire support for the troops landed on Utah Beach to the northwest of the Carentan Estuary. On 6 June, Rich laid down a smoke screen which foiled an attack by German E-Boat.

Soon after 08:45 on 8 June, she was ordered by the Commander of Task Group 125.8 (TG 125.8) aboard Tuscaloosa to Fire Support Area 3 to assist the destroyer Glennon which had struck a mine northwest of the Saint-Marcouf Islands. Rich proceeded at full speed to the area, and then followed in the wake of two minesweepers to the immediate area of the Glennon. Closing Glennon, Rich dispatched a whaleboat, only to learn that her assistance was not needed at that point. Rich then started to round the disabled ship and take up station ahead of the minesweeper which had taken Glennon in tow. She moved at slow speed, with extra hands on the lookout for enemy planes and mines.

== Sinking ==
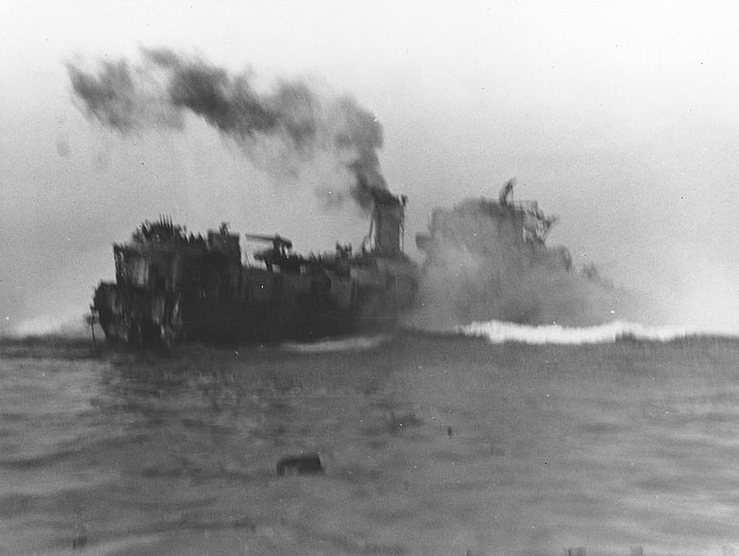
Rich being mined off Normandy on 8 June 1944.

At approximately 09:20, when Rich was about 300 yd (270 m) from the minesweeper Staff, which was in the process of taking Glennon in tow, a mine exploded 50 yd (46 m) off Rich's starboard beam. This tripped circuit breakers, knocked out the ship's lighting, shook the ship hard, and knocked sailors off their feet, but caused no structural damage. Within a minute, the engine room reported that they were "ready to answer all bells". Three minutes later, a second mine went off directly under the ship. Approximately 50 ft (15 m) of her stern was blown off, from frame 130 aft, just aft of the 1.1 in (28 mm) mount in 'X' position. Even though the blown-off stern section caught fire, survivors clung to her wreckage, and it sank shortly afterward. There was a 3 ft (0.91 m) sag in the main deck, and two torpedoes ran hot in their tubes. A third mine – another influence mine – exploded below the ice machine room forward, delivering the final blow two minutes later. The forward section was totally wrecked, the flying bridge demolished, and forward fire room severely damaged, and the mast came crashing down. Life rafts were ordered cut loose, and Rich was ordered abandoned. Several PT boats in a squadron commanded by Lt. Cdr. John D. Bulkeley came alongside Rich to take off personnel. All this time, they were being shelled by German shore batteries. A few minutes later, she sank in about 40 ft (12 m) of water at 49°31′N 1°10.6′W. Of her crew, 27 were killed, 73 were wounded, and 64 were missing; in all, 91 were killed outright or died of wounds following their rescue. Rich was the only American destroyer escort lost in the invasion force. Lt. Cdr. Edward A. Michel Jr. – who suffered a broken leg – was awarded the Navy Cross for extraordinary heroism in the incident.

After the Normandy beachhead was no longer being actively used, machinery, guns, ammunition, and other equipment was salvaged from the wreck. After the war, the wreck was thoroughly stripped by scavengers. A few of her artifacts are on display at the Normandy D-Day Museum. One of her propellers is also on display in front of the museum.

== Awards ==
Rich earned one battle star for service during World War II.
