= USS Rich (DD-820) =

Gearing-class destroyer

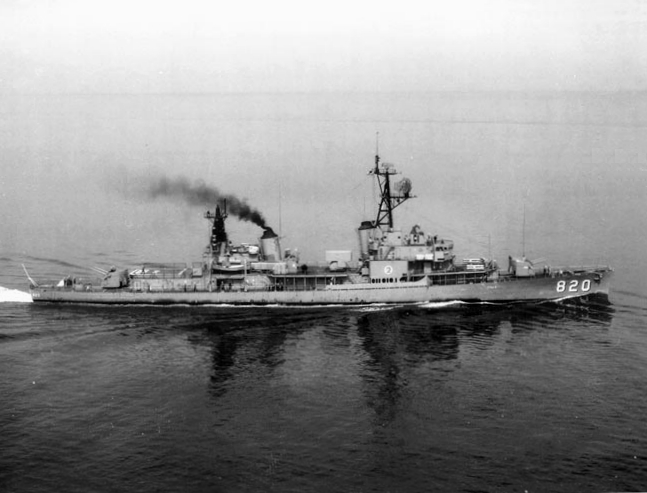
- USS Rich (DD-820) underway in March 1968

History

United States
- Name: Rich
- Namesake: LT(JG) Ralph McMaster Rich
- Builder: Consolidated Steel Corporation
- Laid down: 16 May 1945
- Launched: 5 October 1945
- Sponsored by: Mrs. Ralph McMaster Rich
- Commissioned: 3 July 1946
- Decommissioned: 10 November 1977
- Reclassified: DDE-820, March 1950
- Stricken: 15 December 1977
- Home port: Norfolk VA
- Identification: Callsign: NAYI; Hull number: DD-820
- Motto: "Hunter Killer"
- Fate: Sold for scrapping 5 December 1979

General characteristics
- Class & type: Gearing-class destroyer
- Displacement: 2,425 tons
- Length: 390 ft 6 in (119.02 m)
- Beam: 41 ft 1 in (12.52 m)
- Draft: 18 ft 6 in (5.64 m)
- Speed: 35 knots (65 km/h; 40 mph)
- Complement: 336
- Armament: 3 × twin 5 in (127 mm)/38 cal. gun; 3 × quad 40 mm guns; 2 × twin 40 mm gun; 10 × twin 20 mm cannon; 1 × quintuple 21 in (533 mm) torpedo tubes; 6 × depth charge projectors; 2 × depth charge tracks
- Aviation facilities: "DASH"

USS Rich (DD-820/DDE-820) was a Gearing-class destroyer in the United States Navy during the Korean War and the Vietnam War. She was the second ship named in honor of Lieutenant (junior grade) Ralph McMaster Rich (1916–1942), who was awarded the Navy Cross for his leadership as a naval aviator aboard USS Enterprise during the Battle of Midway.

== History ==
The second Rich (DD-820) was laid down on 16 May 1945 by the Consolidated Steel Corporation at their yard in Orange, Texas. The ship was launched on 5 October 1945, sponsored by Mrs. Ralph McMaster Rich, widow of the vessel's namesake. Rich was commissioned on 3 July 1946.

After a shakedown in the Caribbean Sea, Rich departed Norfolk, Virginia, in late October for a Mediterranean tour, most of which, from December 1946 to March 1947, was spent on patrol in the Atlantic. Returning to the United States in March, she was converted to a specialized anti-submarine warfare ship at the New York Naval Shipyard; and, in the fall, she resumed operations with the 2nd Fleet. Throughout 1948 and into 1949, she operated as a unit of a hunter-killer (HUK) group based at Key West, Florida, in the development of anti-submarine warfare tactics. In August 1949, the destroyer crossed the Atlantic for a brief visit to Cherbourg, France; then returned to east coast and Caribbean operations. In the fall of 1950, Rich, redesignated an escort destroyer (DDE-820) the previous March, returned to the Mediterranean for a month of exercises with the 6th Fleet. By January 1951, she was conducting exercises in the Caribbean; and, in February, she entered the Philadelphia Naval Shipyard for overhaul.

Rotated regularly to duty with the 6th Fleet, Rich operated during the 1950s and 1960s principally off the east coasts of the United States and Canada, in the Caribbean, and in the Mediterranean. In addition to participation in fleet and NATO exercises, she steamed with the 6th Fleet in the eastern Mediterranean during the Suez Crisis of 1956. Two years later she supported the Marine landings in Lebanon.

While with the 2nd Fleet, Rich served in the search and rescue group which steamed along the route of then-Senator John F. Kennedy's flight to South America on his good will visit in 1960. The next year, she participated in Project Mercury as Lieutenant Colonel John Glenn, USMC, became the first American to orbit the Earth; and from 25 October to 25 November 1962, she operated with the Quarantine Force during the Cuban Missile Crisis.

Modernized in 1963 during a 10-month FRAM I (Fleet Rehabilitation And Modernization) conversion to increase her habitability and combat capability, she resumed operations with the Atlantic Fleet's anti-submarine forces in 1964. A year later, she was detached for another mission in support of NASA projects and in March and May 1965, she served as a recovery ship for Gemini space shots.

In 1968, Rich's Atlantic-Mediterranean employment schedule was interrupted for duty off Vietnam. From 13 May to 20 July, she provided escort and plane-guard services for attack aircraft carriers in the Gulf of Tonkin. At the end of the month, she assumed search and rescue duties off the coast of North Vietnam and continued them into September. She then concluded her tour in the Far East with naval gunfire support missions for South Vietnamese Army Forces and USMC operations in the I Corps area of northern South Vietnam from 21 September to 1 October.

Rich arrived back at Norfolk on 5 November. Six months later, in May 1969, she was again on station in the Atlantic for another NASA mission, this time Apollo 10. Toward the end of the month, she returned to Norfolk and prepared for an extended deployment with the Middle East Force. Underway on 3 July, she operated in the Indian Ocean area into December, and on 21 January 1970 returned to Norfolk. Overhaul occupied the spring and summer, and in the fall she resumed operations with the 2nd Fleet . In December, she began preparations for another 6th Fleet deployment. After almost two months of operations along the Atlantic seaboard, Rich departed on 22 February 1971 for the Mediterranean and a five-month cruise with the Sixth Fleet. She returned to the east coast on 23 July and continued normal operations and exercises out of Norfolk until November. Rich departed from Norfolk on 17 October and arrived in Subic Bay, Philippine Islands, a month and a day later. Just over three months later, she was on her way back to Norfolk, arriving on 23 March 1973.

In 1977, Rich collided after a refueling with USS Caloosahatchee (AO-98) off Puerto Rico due to a steering casualty onboard Rich. Rich was eventually determined to be damaged beyond economical repair. Rich decommissioned on 10 November 1977 and was struck from the Navy list on 15 December 1977. She was sold for scrap to Union Minerals and Alloys Corporation, New York City, New York, on 5 December 1979.

== Awards ==
Rich was awarded three battle stars for service off Vietnam.
