= USS Bates =

Buckley-class destroyer escort

Coordinates: 26°41′N 127°47′E

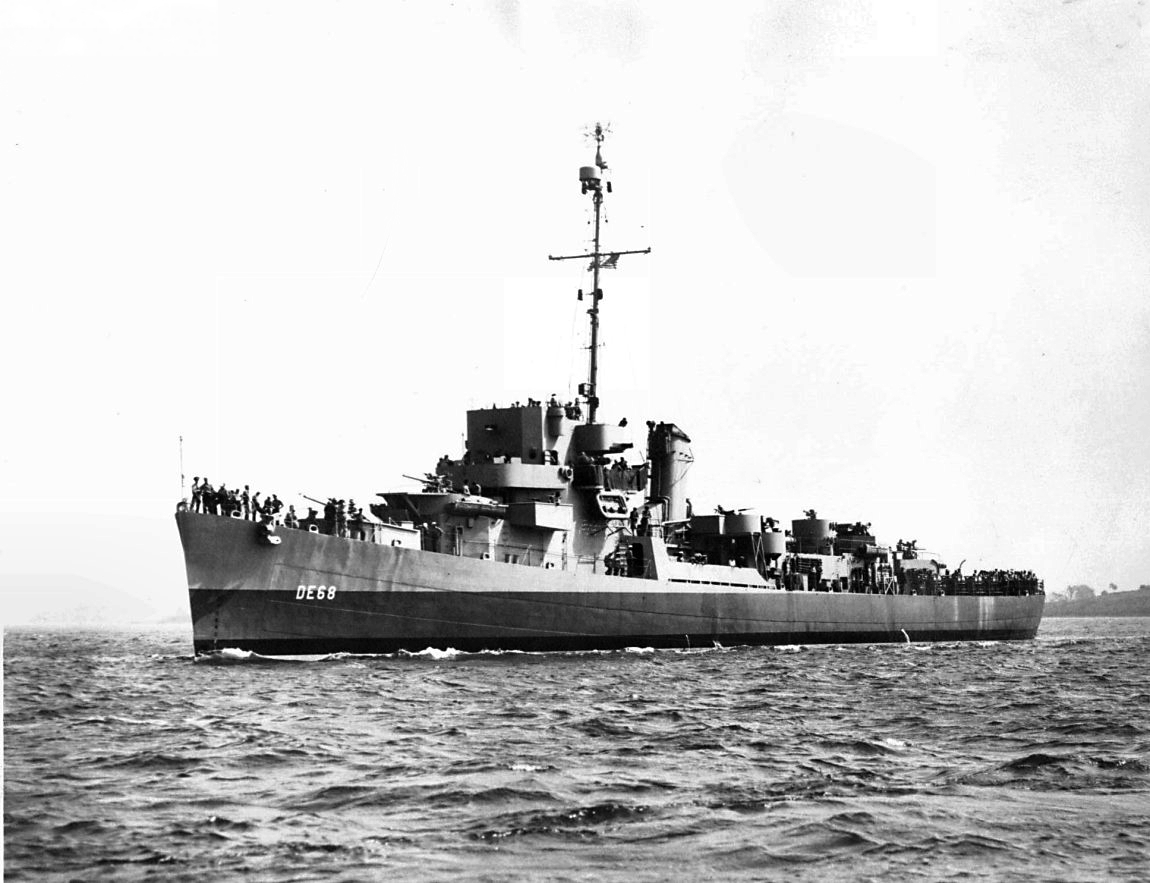

History

United States
- Name: USS Bates
- Builder: Bethlehem Hingham Shipyard
- Launched: 6 June 1943
- Commissioned: 13 September 1943
- Reclassified: APD-47, 31 July 1944
- Honors and awards: 3 battle stars (World War II)
- Fate: Sunk by Kamikazes off Okinawa, 25 May 1945

General characteristics
- Class & type: Buckley-class destroyer escort
- Displacement: 1,400 long tons (1,422 t) light; 1,673 long tons (1,700 t) standard
- Length: 306 ft (93 m)
- Beam: 37 ft (11 m)
- Draft: 9 ft 6 in (2.90 m) standard; 11 ft 3 in (3.43 m) full load
- Propulsion: Turbo-electric drive, 12,000 shp (8.9 MW)
- Speed: 23 knots (43 km/h; 26 mph)
- Complement: 15 officers, 198 men
- Armament: 3 × single 3-inch/50-caliber guns; 1 × quad 1.1-inch/75-caliber gun; 8 × single 20 mm guns; 1 × triple 21 inch (533 mm) torpedo tubes; 1 × Hedgehog anti-submarine mortar; 8 × K-gun depth charge projectors; 2 × depth charge tracks

USS Bates (DE-68/APD-47) was a Buckley-class destroyer escort in service with the United States Navy from 1943 to 1945. She sank after being hit by three kamikaze on 25 May 1945.

== History ==
USS Bates was named in honour of Ensign Edward M. Bates (19 September 1919 – 7 December 1941), who was killed on board USS Arizona during the attack on Pearl Harbor. Bates was launched on 6 June 1943 at the Bethlehem-Hingham Shipyard, Inc., Hingham, Massachusetts; sponsored by Mrs. Elizabeth Mason Bates, mother of Ensign Bates; and commissioned on 12 September 1943.

=== Battle of the Atlantic ===
Bates reported to the Atlantic Fleet, and escorted convoys to and from the British Isles until May 1944, primarily engaged in coastal escort and patrol duty with Escort Division 19. At this time, CortDiv 19 consisted of the destroyer escorts Bates, Bull, Bunch, Rich, Amesbury, and Blessman. She completed three round-trip crossings by May. On 31 May 1944 she arrived at Plymouth, England, and reported to TF 129 in preparation for the invasion of Normandy. Between 6 and 12 June, she carried out fire support duties off the Normandy coast. On 8 June, she rescued 163 survivors of the destroyer Meredith, which sustained severe damage and sank when she struck a mine.

Returning to New York City on 21 June, Bates underwent a brief yard availability and then escorted another convoy to England. Upon her return, she was converted to a Charles Lawrence-class high speed transport by Marine Basin Shipyard, Brooklyn. On 31 July her classification was changed to APD-47. Her conversion was completed on 23 October, and she departed the east coast five days later for the Pacific Ocean.

=== Pacific War ===
Between December 1944 and February 1945, Bates carried out training operations, with various Underwater Demolition Teams embarked, in the vicinity of the Hawaiian and western Caroline Islands. On 10 February, she departed Ulithi en route to the invasion of Iwo Jima. She arrived off Iwo Jima on 16 February and remained in the vicinity until 4 March, during which time she conducted high-speed observation runs around the island and acted as the parent ship for UDT-12.

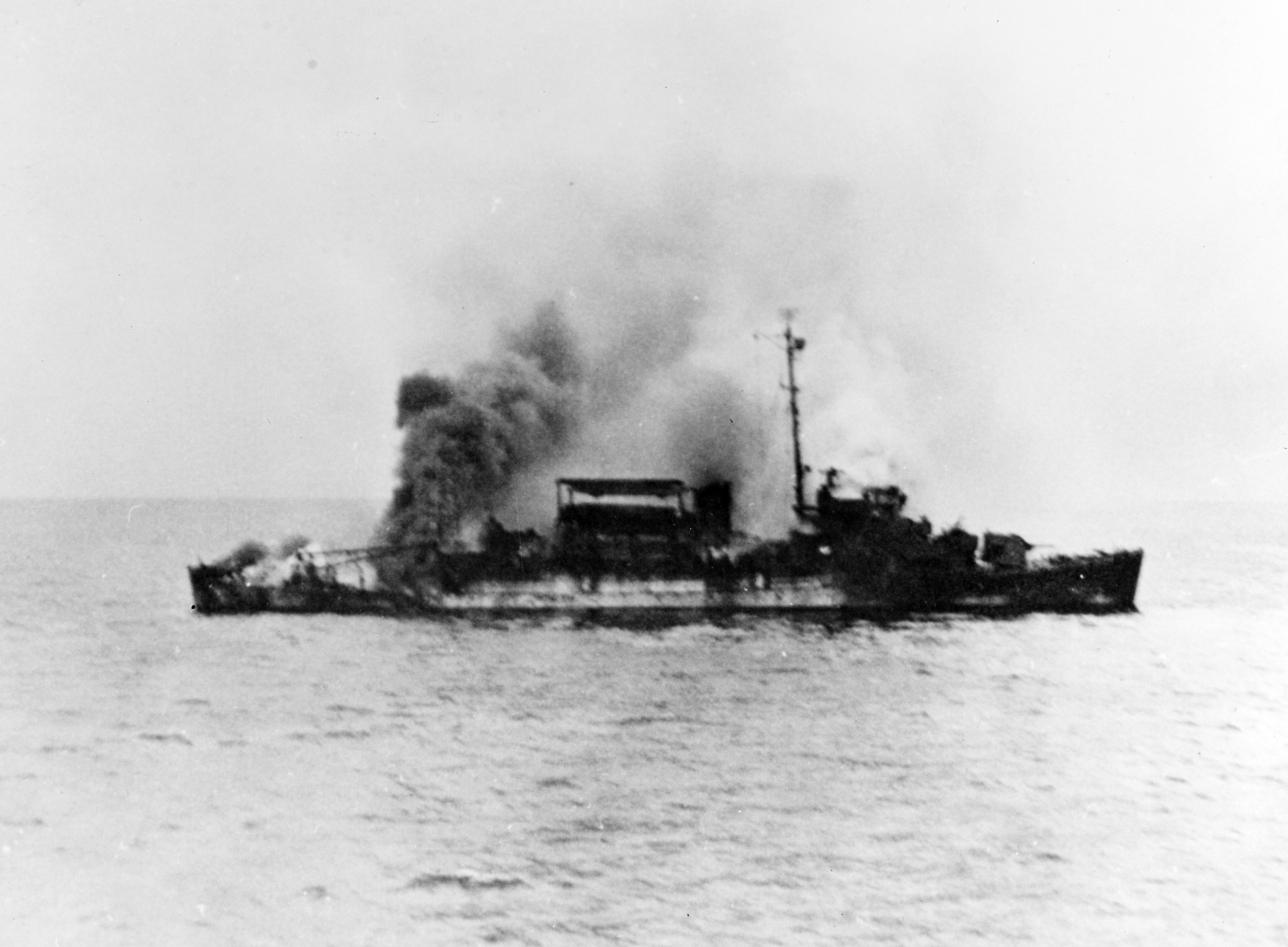
Bates burning, 25 May 1945.

After a brief period of availability at Ulithi she departed for the invasion of Okinawa. Between 25 March and 25 May, Bates assisted in UDT operations, conducted patrols, and escorted two convoys between Ulithi and Okinawa. On 6 April she rescued 23 survivors of the destroyer Morris, which had been hit by a Japanese suicide aircraft.

At 1115 on 25 May, while patrolling two miles south of Ie Shima, Okinawa, Bates was attacked by three Japanese aircraft. The first dropped a bomb, scoring a near miss which ruptured the starboard hull of the ship, and then crashed into the starboard side of the fantail. The second aircraft, almost simultaneously, made a suicide hit on the pilothouse. Shortly thereafter, the third aircraft made a bombing run scoring a near miss amidships, portside, rupturing the hull. At 1145 the commanding officer ordered Bates abandoned. Twenty-one of her crew were either dead or missing from the attacks. During the afternoon, the tug Cree was able to get a line aboard and towed Bates to Ie Shima anchorage. At 1923 on 25 May 1945, the still burning Bates capsized and sank in 20 fathoms of water.

== Awards ==
Bates received three battle stars for her World War II service in the Atlantic and Pacific.
