= Ralph M. Rich =

Ralph McMaster Rich
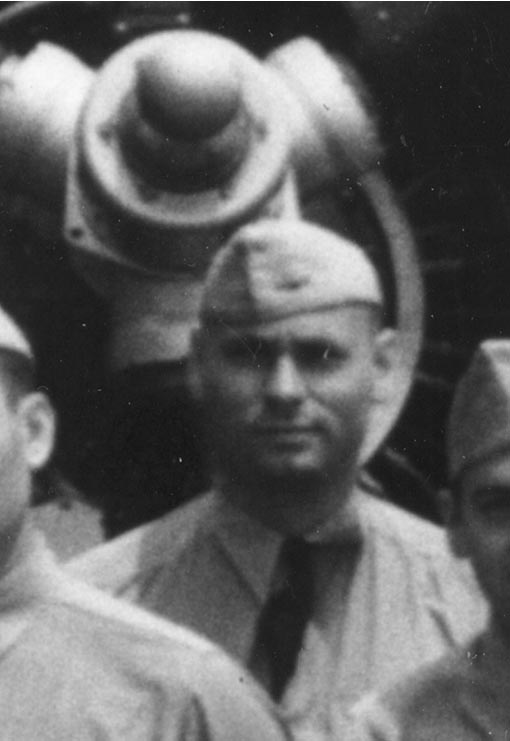
- Ensign Ralph M. Rich, USNR, USS Enterprise (CV-6), January 1942.
- Born: January 22, 1916; Denmark, North Dakota
- Died: June 18, 1942 (aged 26); Hawaiian Islands
- Military career
- Allegiance: United States of America
- Branch: United States Navy
- Service years: 1939–42
- Rank: Lieutenant (junior grade)
- Conflicts: World War II Battle of Midway
- Awards: Navy Cross

Ralph McMaster Rich (22 January 1916 - 18 June 1942) was an aviator of the United States Navy during World War II.

Ralph McMaster Rich, born on 22 January 1916 in Denmark, North Dakota, enlisted in the U.S. Naval Reserve on 12 October 1939 in Minneapolis, Minnesota. After receiving initial flight training in Minnesota, Aviation Cadet Rich reported for active duty at Pensacola, Florida, on 28 December 1939. Designated a Naval Aviator on 12 July 1940, he was commissioned as an Ensign on 16 August, and assigned to Fighting Squadron Six (VF-6) embarked aboard the aircraft carrier Enterprise (CV-6) on 28 November.

ENS Rich participated in several of the early actions of the Pacific War. Among them were the 1 February 1942 raid on the Marshall Islands, in which he destroyed a Japanese bomber on the ground, and the 24 February attack on Wake Island.

Promoted to Lieutenant (junior grade) on 28 May 1942, he led a section of fighters covering the approach of American bombers against the Japanese fleet during the Battle of Midway 4 to 6 June 1942. In addition, Rich is credited with shooting down one enemy torpedo plane while flying on combat air patrol over Yorktown (CV-5). On 18 June 1942, while participating in aerial gunnery practice over the Hawaiian Islands, his F4F-4 "Wildcat" crashed, killing him instantly. During a routine gunnery dive over NAS Kaneohe Bay, a wing tore off of Wildcat, BuNo 5184, of VF-3, at 5,000 feet. He was awarded the Navy Cross posthumously for his "capable and aggressive leadership" in the Midway battle, which enabled his attack group to "maintain continuous flight over enemy naval units, thereby assuring our dive bombers an unmolested approach."

== Namesakes ==
Two Navy ships have been named USS Rich in his honor.
