= Richard Bull (aviator) =

- Born: July 14, 1914; New York City, New York
- Died: February 5, 1942 (aged 27); Shot down near Ambon Island
- Military career
- Allegiance: United States of America
- Branch: United States Navy
- Service years: 1938-1942
- Rank: Ensign
- Conflicts: World War II
- Awards: Distinguished Flying Cross

Richard Bull (14 July 1914 – 5 February 1942) was a United States Navy aviator during World War II.

== Biography ==
He was born in New York City on 14 July 1914. He enlisted in the Navy on 16 July 1938 at Miami, Florida, and underwent flight training at the Naval Air Station Pensacola, Fla., before winning his wings on 12 October 1939. Appointed ensign on 21 November 1939, he was assigned to Patrol Squadron 22 (PatRon 22) on that date. On 28 November 1940, Ens. Bull was designated a patrol plane commander.

Transferred with his squadron to the East Indies early in World War II, Ens. Bull took part in the gallant efforts of Patrol Wing 10 (PatWing 10) as its slow, ungainly PBY Catalina flying boats hunted for elements of the Japanese fleet.

On 21 January 1942, a temporary appointment as lieutenant (junior grade) was sent to Bull, but no record of his execution of the oath of office has been found. While on patrol off the coast of Borneo on 23 January 1942, Bull discovered a transport and two destroyers. Driven off by antiaircraft fire, he persistently remained in the vicinity and, as a result, sighted 26 ships a short time later. During another reconnaissance flight in the vicinity of the island of Ambon in the Netherlands East Indies on 5 February 1942, Bull searched for an enemy aircraft carrier group reported to be nearby. He ran afoul of enemy fighters and was never seen again. For his "extraordinary flying achievement, courage and devotion to duty" in carrying out this mission, Bull received the posthumous award of the Distinguished Flying Cross.

== Namesake ==
In 1943, two ships were named USS Bull in Lt. Bull's honor.
