= USS Blessman =

Buckley-class destroyer escort

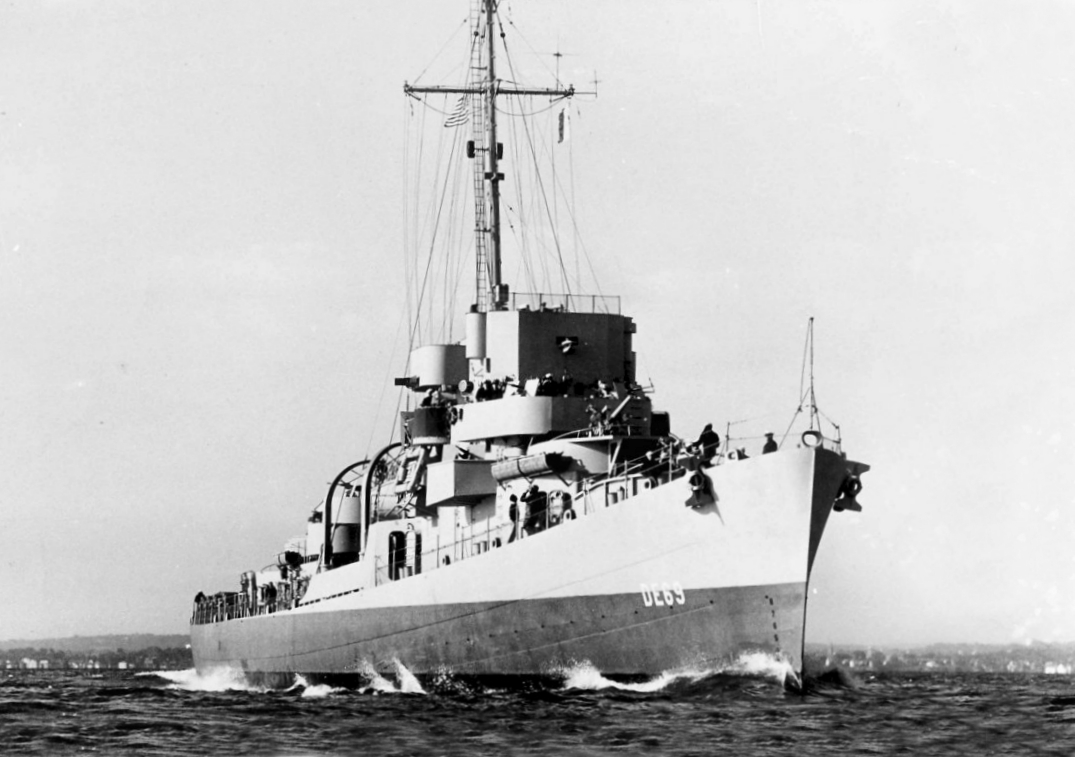

History

United States
- Name: USS Blessman (DE-69)
- Namesake: Edward Martin Blessman
- Ordered: 1942
- Builder: Bethlehem-Hingham Shipyard
- Laid down: 22 March 1943 as Buckley-class destroyer escort
- Launched: 19 June 1943
- Commissioned: 19 September 1943
- Reclassified: APD-48, 31 June 1944
- Decommissioned: 15 January 1947
- Stricken: 1 June 1967
- Honors and awards: 3 battle stars (World War II)
- Fate: Transferred to Taiwan, 3 July 1967

History

Taiwan
- Name: ROCS Chung Shan (DE-43)
- Acquired: 3 July 1967
- Reclassified: PF-43
- Reclassified: PF-845
- Reclassified: PF-843
- Stricken: May 1995
- Fate: broken up for scrap

General characteristics
- Class & type: Buckley-class destroyer escort
- Displacement: 1,400 long tons (1,422 t) standard; 1,740 long tons (1,768 t) full
- Length: 306 ft (93 m)
- Beam: 37 ft (11 m)
- Draft: 9 ft 6 in (2.90 m) standard; 11 ft 3 in (3.43 m) full
- Propulsion: 2 × boilers; General Electric turbo-electric drive; 12,000 shp (8.9 MW); 2 × solid manganese-bronze 3,600 lb (1,600 kg) 3-bladed propellers, 8 ft 6 in (2.59 m) diameter, 7 ft 7 in (2.31 m) pitch; 2 × rudders; 359 tons fuel oil
- Speed: 23 knots (43 km/h; 26 mph)
- Range: 3,700 nmi (6,900 km) at 15 kn (28 km/h; 17 mph); 6,000 nmi (11,000 km) at 12 kn (22 km/h; 14 mph)
- Complement: 15 officers, 198 men
- Armament: 3 × single 3-inch/50-caliber guns; 1 × quad 1.1-inch/75-caliber gun; 8 × single 20 mm guns; 1 × triple 21 inch (533 mm) torpedo tubes; 1 × Hedgehog anti-submarine mortar; 8 × K-gun depth charge projectors; 2 × depth charge tracks

USS Blessman (DE-69/APD-48), a Buckley-class destroyer escort of the United States Navy, was named in honor of Lieutenant Edward Martin Blessman (1907–1942), who was killed in action in the Pacific on 4 February 1942. (Note: Edward Martin Blessman was killed aboard USS Marblehead on 4 February 1942 when Japanese aircraft attacked the ship and scored several hits and near misses.)

The ship was built by the Bethlehem-Hingham Shipyard at Hingham, Massachusetts in 1943. After commissioning, Blessman escorted convoys in the North Atlantic before taking part in Operation Overlord, the Allied invasion of Northern France in June 1944. She was then converted to a High-speed transport, being fitted with accommodation and landing craft for carrying troops, while being capable of escorting amphibious groups and providing gunfire support to landing operations. After conversion, Blessman took part in the Allied invasion of the Philippines and the Battle of Iwo Jima, where she was damaged by a Japanese bomber.

After the war, Blessman went into reserve, before being transferred to Taiwan in 1967, serving in the Republic of China Navy as Chung Shan until 1995.

== Construction and design ==
The Buckley class was one of six classes of destroyer escorts built for the US Navy to meet the massive demand for escort vessels following America's entry into World War Two. While basically similar, the different classes were fitted with different propulsion gear and armament. The Buckleys had a turbo-electric drive, and a main gun armament of 3-inch guns.

The Buckley (or TE) class ships were 306 feet (93.27 m) long overall and 300 feet (91.44 m) between perpendiculars, with a beam of 37 feet (11.28 m) and a mean draft of 11 feet 3 inches (3.43 m). Displacement was 1,432 long tons (1,455 t) standard and 1,823 long tons (1,852 t) full load. Two boilers fed steam to steam turbines which drove electrical generators, with in turn powered electric motors that propelled the ship. The machinery was rated at 12,000 shaft horsepower (8,900 kW), giving a speed of 23 knots (26 mph; 43 km/h). 340 long tons (350 t) of oil was carried, giving a range of 5,000 nautical miles (5,800 mi; 9,300 km) at 15 knots (17 mph; 28 km/h).

The ship's main gun armament consisted of three 3-inch (76 mm) 50 caliber dual-purpose (i.e. anti-surface and anti-aircraft) guns, two forward and one aft, in open mounts. Close in armament consisted of a quadruple 1.1-inch/75-caliber gun, backed up by eight single Oerlikon 20 mm cannon. A triple mount of 21-inch (533 mm) torpedo tubes provided a capability against larger ships, while anti-submarine armament consisted of a Hedgehog forward-firing anti-submarine mortar and eight depth charge projectors and two depth charge rails. Crew was 186 officers and other ranks.

Blessman was laid down on 22 March 1943 at Bethlehem Shipbuilding Corporation's Hingham Shipyard, in Hingham, Massachusetts. The ship was launched on 19 June 1943, sponsored by Mrs. Helen Malloy Blessman, widow of Lieutenant Blessman, and commissioned on 19 September 1943.

== Service history ==
=== Convoy escort, 1943–1944 ===
After fitting out at the Boston Navy Yard and running her acceptance trials in Massachusetts Bay, Blessman departed Boston on 9 October 1943 for shakedown training. Operating out of Bermuda, the new destroyer escort completed her initial gunnery, anti-submarine, and engineering training early in November. She left Bermuda on the 5th, arrived in Boston on the 8th and began post-shakedown availability.

Leaving Boston again a week later, Blessman reached the New York Navy Yard on the 16th. Assigned to Escort Division (CortDiv) 19, the destroyer escort sailed with a fast troop convoy on 20 November, screening it safely across the Atlantic and into Derry, Northern Ireland, ten days later. Clearing the Irish Sea on 8 December, Blessman escorted a westward-bound convoy on the return leg of her maiden voyage and arrived at New York five days before Christmas of 1943. Over the next six months, Blessman made three more round-trip Atlantic crossings escorting convoys, returning from the last of these on 1 May.

=== Normandy invasion, 1944 ===
Her fifth Atlantic passage proved the most eventful. Clearing New York on 12 May, she arrived at the other end of the "Milk Run" on the 23rd, at Derry. Instead of returning in the screen of a westbound convoy, however, she shifted to Belfast on the 27th in company with her sister ships and division mates Rich, Bates, and Amesbury, and became part of the armada forming for the assault on Normandy. Blessman departed Belfast on 3 June and headed for Baie de la Seine, France, escorting the bombardment group of the assault force. Heavy weather compelled the postponement of the invasion of France, but it abated enough to permit the landings to commence on 6 June. Initially, Blessman drew duty screening the amphibious command ship Ancon. Then, as "Operation Overlord" actually unfolded, Blessman switched to screening to seaward of the invasion force to deal with possible E-boat attacks.

Mines, however, proved a much greater threat than any posed by enemy aircraft and ships. Attack transport Susan B. Anthony struck one early on 7 June, while proceeding in what had been regarded as a swept channel. By 0805 the stricken auxiliary was taking water badly. Having lost all power, with her rudder stuck "hard left", Susan B. Anthony assumed an eight-degree list to starboard. Blessman gingerly came alongside the doomed, drifting, ship and removed six officers and 38 enlisted men before being ordered away because of the imminent danger of the transport's foundering. Less than an hour later, Blessman sped to the assistance of the mined USAT Francis C. Harrington. After embarking 26 seriously wounded men, the destroyer escort transported them to an LST designated to handle casualties.

Detached from "Overlord" on 12 June, after rounding out her duty screening the invasion force from air attacks and E-boat raids, Blessman reached New York on the 21st. She then escorted a troop convoy to Derry in early July and returned home as an escort for a convoy of transports bearing men wounded in the fighting at Normandy, and brought her sixth round-trip to a conclusion at the end of July.

=== Conversion to high speed transport, 1944 ===
While en route home, Blessman had received word that she was to be converted to a Charles Lawrence-class high speed transport. Accordingly, she entered the Sullivan Drydock and Repair Corporation yard, Brooklyn, New York, on 28 July 1944. She emerged from this major overhaul and alteration period on 25 October 1944, reconfigured to handle four landing boats (LCP(R)) and troops. Redesignated APD-48, Blessman departed New York and headed for a brief shakedown in Chesapeake Bay before continuing on to the Pacific. The warship proceeded to her new theater of war, sailing via the Panama Canal, and, after touching at San Diego and San Francisco en route, reached Hawaii on 27 November. At Pearl Harbor, Blessman embarked Underwater Demolition Team (UDT) 15 and resumed her voyage westward on 11 December.

=== Pacific theater, 1945 ===
She touched at Eniwetok, Saipan, Ulithi, and the Palaus, leaving Kossol Roads on New Year's Day 1945, bound for Luzon. Enemy air attacks began to materialize on 3 January, as the invasion forces neared their objective. American sailors again encountered kamikazes, suicide aircraft that they had first met only weeks before in the invasion of Leyte. The attacks continued over the following days, "off and on, day and night".

==== Invasion of Luzon ====
Blessman's primary mission off Luzon lay in sending UDT 15 to assault beaches Green No. 1 and Yellow No. 2, covering the swimmers with her guns while they reconnoitered surf conditions, located underwater obstacles, and determined beach gradients. At 1430 on 7 January 1945, Blessman stood in toward the Lingayen beaches and, by 1436, had all four of her LCPLs in the water. The boats shoved off 20 minutes later. Reaching her assigned position off the objective at 1510, Blessman soon commenced firing with her forward 5-inch gun. She maintained covering fire for her UDT until shortly before she recovered her four boats. All LCPLs were on board by 1650, and Blessman then headed to a rendezvous with Humphreys to transfer UDT-15's commanding officer to that ship with the results of the day's covering the night retirement of TG 77.2.reconnaissance. The transfer went off by 1815, and Blessman took position in the screen.

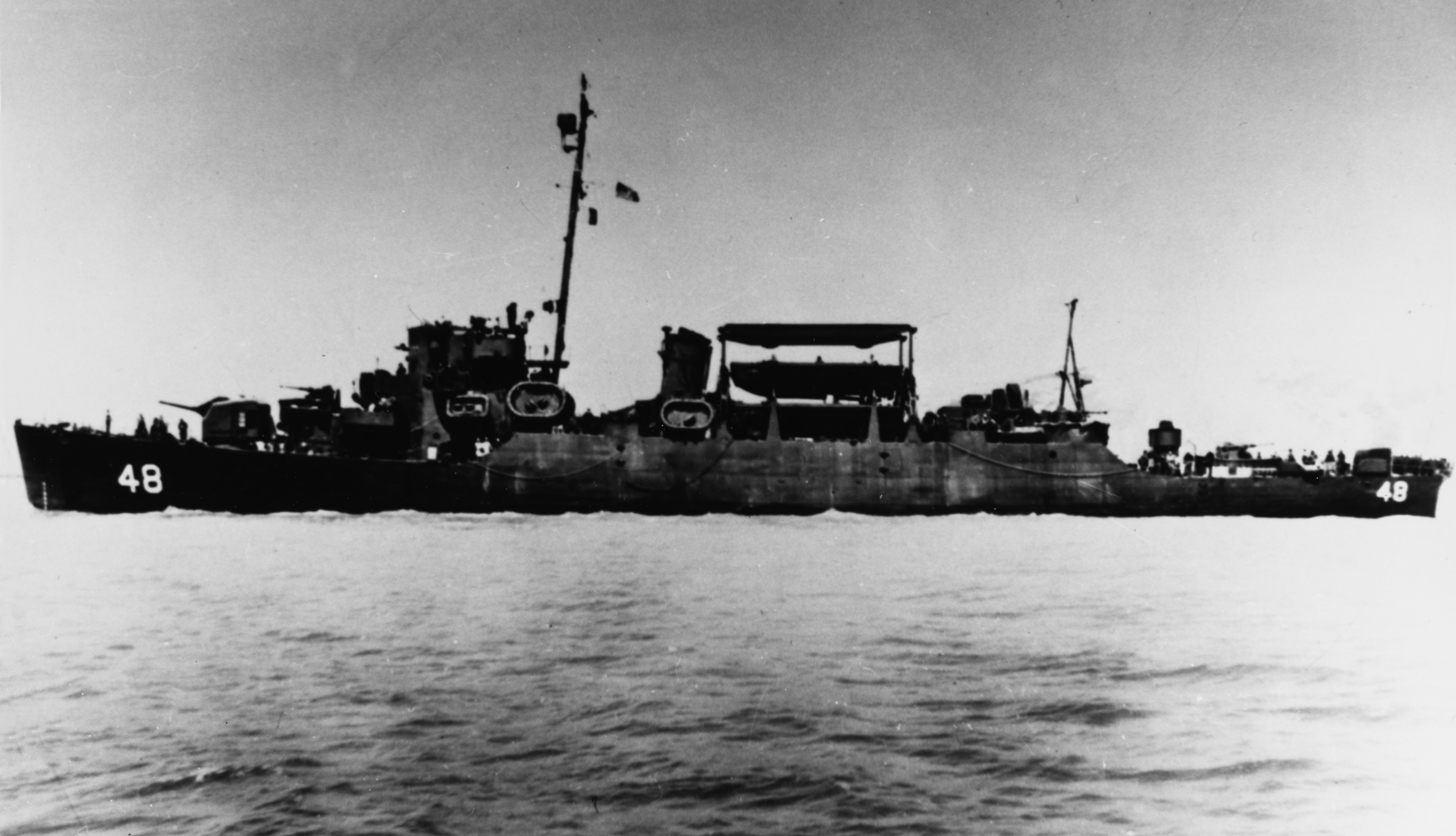
Blessman as a high-speed transport.

As that task group returned to the gulf to carry out its assigned shore bombardment mission, Blessman returned with it, bringing the commander of UDT-15 back on board that morning at 0800 before the ship received orders to close California (BB-44) and to lower a boat. She complied and soon embarked Capt. B. Hall Hanlon, Commander, UDT Pacific Fleet, and two members of his staff. Over the next two days, Blessman served as courier and delivered mail among the ships of TG 77.2, each night taking a station to seaward in the screen of the task force. On 10 January, Blessman's unit had a close encounter with a kamikaze when she and other vessels in the screen took an enemy aircraft under fire at 0711. "It finally dove", wrote Blessman's commanding officer, "after circling high above as though trying to make up its mind who to hit", and crashed close aboard a destroyer on the picket line 1,800 yards (1,600 m) to the east.

Later that afternoon, Blessman, in response to the orders from the task unit commander embarked in Humphreys, sent UDT-15 on a beach reconnaissance mission "from the east flank of Crimson Beach to a point 3,000 yards (2,700 m) east of that point." Still later, she received orders to report to the commander of Destroyer Division (DesDiv) 120 for escort duty. Accordingly, she moved out, recalling her boats as she did so. A heavy surf prevented the recovery of four of UDT-15's men who finally found temporary shelter on board LST-627 and LSM-11 and who Humphreys later returned to their own ship.

After Capt. Hanlon had returned from Wasatch, and Blessman had recovered all of her LCPLs, the fast transport departed the area at flank speed and joined the designated task unit for the passage to Leyte, reporting "on station" at 2015. On 13 January, Blessman arrived at Leyte and reported for duty to the Commander, Philippine Sea Frontier. After escorting transports back to Ulithi, the warship rested, reprovisioned, and trained for her next operation that would take her one step nearer to Japan.

==== Invasion of Iwo Jima ====
Blessman reported for duty at Ulithi, and in company with other high-speed transports of TG 52.4, on 3 and 6 February 1945, conducted rehearsals for her forthcoming operation - the invasion of Iwo Jima. All units of the task force to which Blessman was attached, TF-52, sailed from Ulithi for Saipan on 10 February for further training and rehearsals that were carried out on 12 and 13 February. During these practice evolutions Blessman operated as a screening vessel. Her sonar gear failed on the 11th, but was left inoperative owing to the lack of time to repair the damage.

On 14 February, TF-52, with Blessman among its warships, sailed from Saipan at 0900. Her captain at this point was Lieutenant Philip LeBoutillier. On the 16th, after the Fire Support Units 1 and 4 had commenced the pre-landing bombardment of Iwo Jima, Blessman was detached from the screen and conducted a close reconnaissance of the beaches while circling the island counter-clockwise.

After screening the heavy ships that evening, Blessman rendezvoused with Gilmer south of "Hot Rocks," the code name for Iwo Jima, shortly after 0941 on the 17th. She then lowered three of her four boats and sent in UDT-15 to reconnoiter beaches and observed small caliber shell splashes around her as she retired to seaward. Upon reaching a point some 8,000 yards (7,300 m) from the shore, Blessman stood off Beaches Blue 1 and Blue 2 for a little over an hour before standing in and recovering her boats. Despite the heavy opposition reported by UDT-15, only one man (Frank Sumpter) was hit by a bullet – he died of his head wound a few hours later; the covering LCI(G)'s, though, reported sustaining much damage and many casualties. That afternoon, Blessman carried out another beach reconnaissance, recovered all of her boats safely by 1751, and stood out to the command ship Estes. The following day, 18 February, she headed for a screening station.

==== Damaged by bombs ====
While she was en route, however, an enemy bomber, identified as a "Betty", came in at 2121, very low over the port quarter, strafing, and scored a direct bomb hit in the high-speed transport's starboard mess hall, above her number one engine room. A second bomb hit her stack, glanced off, and splashed close aboard without exploding. Fire broke out immediately in the mess hall, galley, and troop quarters on the main deck; and the ship lost all power. Heavy smoke forced the abandonment of the number two fire and engine rooms, while a 500-gallon-per-minute portable pump was demolished and all other such pumps were rendered inoperable by the shock. This damage reduced Blessman's crew to bucket brigades and the use of helmets to try to keep the blaze from spreading. Her sailors jettisoned topside ammunition aft, and attempted to clear ammunition from clipping rooms and bedding from troop quarters to halt the fire's spread. At 2250, anti-aircraft and small arms ammunition began exploding, forcing the evacuation of wounded to stern.

In all, 40 men were killed, including 15 of the UDT.

The ship's radios were out of commission, but a radio was found in one of the boats and was used to send a message to Barr. Gilmer came to help but at first kept a distance of 300 yards. It was unclear how much danger there was of TNT on the Blessman exploding. Draper Kauffman, head of the UDT teams, took a boat from the Gilmer to the Blessman to assess the situation. Gilmer came alongside around 2310, commenced pouring water on the blaze, and also sent across hoses. Gilmer evacuated the wounded in her boats and on a rubber raft. By 0300 on the 19th, the combined efforts of both ships' crewmen brought the fire under control, although some small arms ammunition continued to explode. After transferring all passengers and wounded to Gilmer, Blessman was taken in tow by Ardent and headed back to Iwo Jima. Towed around the northern end of Iwo Jima, Blessman buried her dead at sea and then - towed in turn by Gear, LSM-70, and Hitchiti - reached Saipan at 1800 on 24 February and moored alongside Hamul. Her historian recorded that, on the voyage to Saipan Blessman's men "...lived more like soldiers than sailors," cooking their meals in a makeshift fireplace on the fantail.

As her chronicler also recorded it, "The repair officers at Saipan" he continued, "thought little of the practicability of restoring the ruined ship." But, as they made their estimates, "Blessman's crew was busy." The rapid strides her sailors made in carrying out repairs caused these experts to revise their estimates accordingly. Made seaworthy enough for the trans-Pacific voyage, Blessman arrived at the Mare Island Navy Yard on 23 April 1945 for permanent repairs. While this work proceeded, the ship was designated as flagship for Underwater Demolition Squadron (UDRon) 1. Clearing Mare Island for Oceanside, California, on 11 August, to embark Capt. Roy D. Williams, Commander, UDRon 1, the ship reached that port on the 14th and embarked UDT-17. The next day, Capt. Williams hoisted his command pennant on board Blessman.

=== Post-war activity and decommissioning, 1945–1946 ===
On 16 August, two days after V-J Day, Blessman sailed for the western Pacific to take part in the occupation of Japan. After stops at Pearl Harbor, Eniwetok, Ulithi, Manila, Subic Bay, and Okinawa, the fast transport entered Wakanoura Wan, where UDT 17 charted the landing beaches soon to be used by the Army's I Corps to occupy the Kobe-Osaka area. Five days later, Blessman stood out of Wakanoura Wan and headed for the west coast of the United States. Following a pre-inactivation overhaul, Blessman was placed in reserve on 28 August 1946 in the San Diego group of the Reserve Fleet. She was decommissioned on 15 January 1947.

=== Transfer to Taiwan, 1967 ===
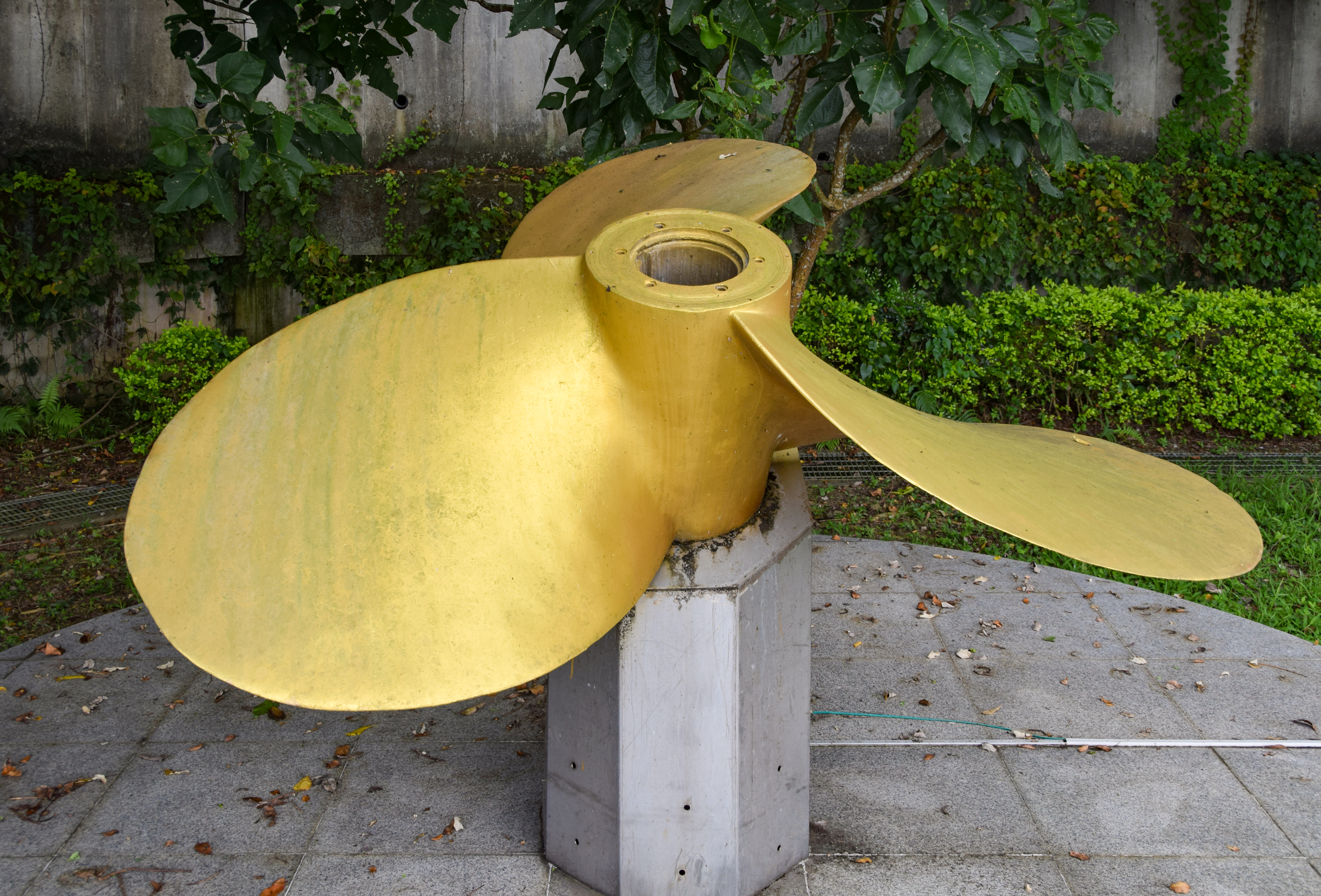
One of the propellers on display at the New Taipei City Weapon Park in July 2023

Blessman was transferred to Taiwan on 19 May 1967, and was struck from the Navy List on 1 June 1967. Renamed ROCS Chung Shan with the pennant number PF 43, the ship was rated as a frigate rather than an amphibious transport by the Republic of China Navy. Chung Shan was given the new pennant number 845 in 1976. By 1979 she had been fitted with a second 5-inch gun aft and by 1985 her Hedgehog anti-submarine mortar had been replaced by two triple Mark 32 torpedo tubes for 12.75-inch (324 mm) anti-submarine torpedoes. In the early 1990s, Chung Shan, along with other surviving ex-destroyer escorts in Taiwanese service, was transferred to fisheries protection duties, and was disarmed, with only two 40 mm Bofors guns remaining. Chang Shan was stricken from Taiwanese service in May 1995.

One of her propeller is on display at the New Taipei City Weapon Park (新北市武器公園).

== Awards ==
Blessman received three battle stars for her World War II service.
