= USS Richard S. Bull =

Ship

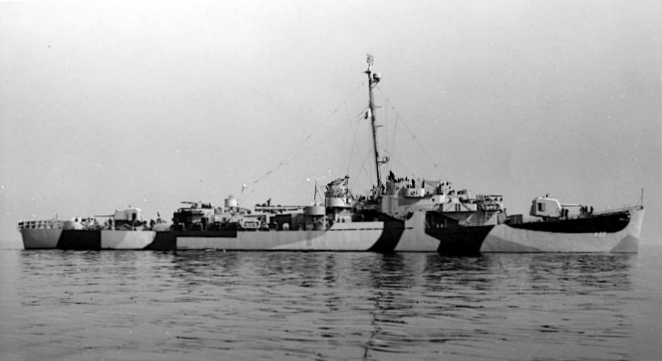
- USS Richard S. Bull on 27 April 1944

History

United States
- Name: Richard S. Bull
- Laid down: 18 August 1943
- Launched: 16 November 1943
- Commissioned: 26 February 1944
- Decommissioned: March 1946
- Stricken: 30 June 1968
- Honours and awards: 5 battle stars for World War II
- Fate: Sunk as target off California, 24 June 1969

General characteristics
- Class & type: John C. Butler-class destroyer escort; WGT (geared-turbine drive, 5" guns)
- Displacement: 1,350 long tons (1,372 t)
- Length: 306 ft (93 m), overall
- Beam: 36 ft 10 in (11.23 m)
- Draft: 13 ft 4 in (4.06 m) (max)
- Propulsion: 2 boilers, 2 geared steam turbines, 12,000 shp (8,900 kW), 2 screws
- Speed: 24 knots (44 km/h; 28 mph)
- Range: 6,000 nautical miles at 12 knots; (11,000 km at 22 km/h)
- Complement: 14 officers, 201 enlisted
- Armament: 2 5 in (127 mm) DP guns, 4 (2×2) 40 mm AA guns, 10 20 mm cannon, 3 21 in (533 mm) torpedo tubes, 1 Hedgehog projector, 2 depth charge tracks, 8 K-gun depth charge projectors

USS Richard S. Bull (DE-402) was a John C. Butler-class destroyer escort in service with the United States Navy from 1944 to 1946. She was finally sunk as a target in 1969.

== Namesake ==
Richard Salisbury Bull Jr. was born on 6 January 1913 in Wilkinsburg, Pennsylvania. Graduating from the United States Naval Academy, he was commissioned ensign on 4 June 1936. Trained as a naval aviator in 1938–39 at Naval Air Station Pensacola, Florida, he served in the fleet in 1941. He became a naval observer assigned to the American Embassy in London, England.

Reporting for duty as a fighter pilot on board USS Lexington on 27 December 1941, he missed out on the early raids against the Japanese as his squadron VF-2 was converting from Brewster F2A Buffalos to Grumman F4F Wildcats (their place being taken by the Grumman-equipped VF-3). In the Battle of the Coral Sea on 8 May 1942, he led the escort section assigned to Lexington's Air Group Commander, Cdr. William B. Ault. After Ault and his men had dive-bombed the carrier Shōkaku, scoring one hit, Bull and his wingman, Ens. John B. Bain, were attacked by Zero fighters. Bain managed to fight his way out, but Bull was never seen again. He was posthumously awarded earned the Distinguished Flying Cross.

== History ==
The ship's keel was laid down on 18 August 1943 by Brown Shipbuilding Co. at their yard in Houston, Texas. The vessel was launched on 16 November 1943, sponsored by Mrs. Richard S. Bull Sr., and commissioned on 26 February 1944.

=== World War II ===
Following shakedown off Bermuda, Richard S. Bull departed Boston, Massachusetts on 6 May 1944, and proceeded via the Panama Canal to Pearl Harbor, arriving on 30 May. Reaching Eniwetok 27 June, she escorted Long Island and other escort carriers to Pearl Harbor, arriving on 5 July.

Returning to Eniwetok, she joined a task force including Sangamon on 6 August. Arriving at Manus on 13 August, Williams supported the landings on Morotai on 15 September. Departing Manus, she protected carrier forces supporting the landings on Leyte on 20 October. The destroyer escort rescued a fighter pilot from the escort carrier Chenango on 22 October.

During the Battle off Samar on 25 October, she operated in group "Taffy One," about 130 miles (210 km) south of the main Japanese attack upon "Taffy Three." Following a kamikaze attack upon Taffy One, she rescued 24 men from the escort carrier Suwanee. On 29 October Richard S. Bull discovered and rescued 139 survivors of the destroyer escort Eversole, sunk by Japanese submarine I-45 off Dinagat Island, Philippine Islands. Nearby, the destroyer escort Whitehurst sank I-45.

After transferring the Eversole survivors to Bountiful, at Kossol Roads, Palau Island, she proceeded with escort carriers from Manus to Pearl Harbor, arriving on 19 November. After escorting Shamrock Bay to arrival at Manus on 22 December, she departed with Marcus Island, and proceeded via Leyte to the landings 9 January 1945 at Lingayen Gulf, Luzon, Philippine Islands. Proceeding via Ulithi and Saipan, she rescued three aviators from Natoma Bay on 17 February, and then protected escort carriers supporting the landings on Iwo Jima on 19 February. Departing the Iwo Jima area 10 March, she proceeded via Guam and Ulithi to the Okinawa Gunto.

From 1 April to 16 May, she protected escort carriers supporting assault forces on Okinawa. Returning 2 June from Saipan, she continued to guard carrier air operations against Okinawa. Voyaging with the escort carrier Sargent Bay to arrival at Leyte on 23 June, she joined the Philippine Sea Frontier, escorting convoys to Morotai, Hollandia, and Ulithi. She provided medical treatment 30 August to casualties aboard SS Peter White, damaged by a mine in the northern Philippines. Following convoy escort duty from Leyte to Ulithi and Okinawa, she departed Leyte on 14 October, and steamed via Eniwetok and Pearl Harbor to San Diego, California, arriving on 6 November.

=== Decommissioning ===
She entered the Pacific Reserve Fleet in March 1946, and remained in the Reserve fleet until struck from the Navy List on 30 June 1968, and sunk as a target off California on 24 June 1969.

== Awards ==
Richard S. Bull received five battle stars for her service in the Pacific War.
