= USS Bunch =

Buckley-class destroyer escort

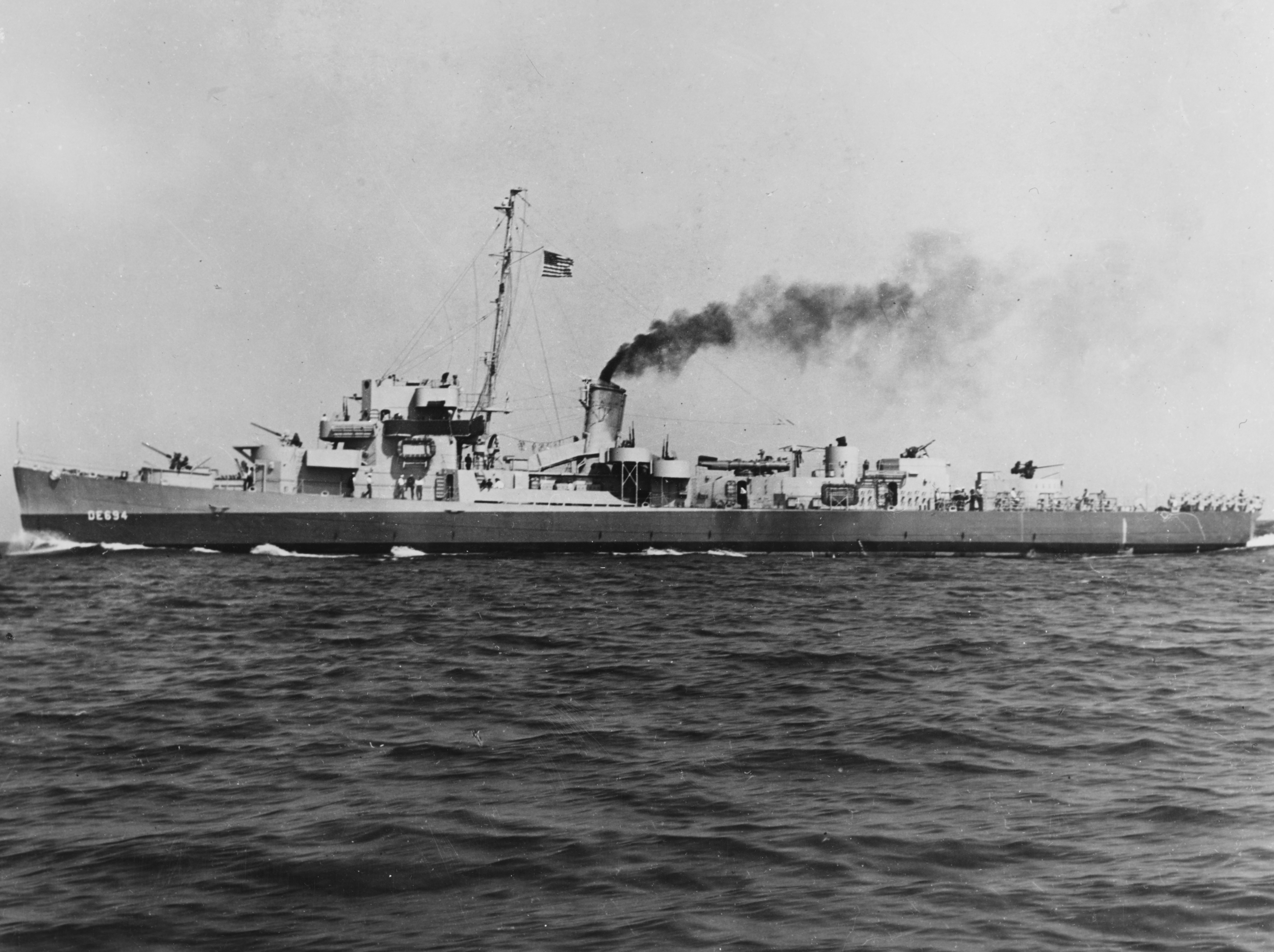
- USS Bunch (DE-694), running trials in Lake Huron on 25 July 1943

History

United States
- Name: Bunch
- Namesake: Kenneth Cecil Bunch
- Ordered: 9 October 1942
- Builder: Defoe Shipbuilding Company, Bay City, Michigan
- Laid down: 23 February 1943
- Launched: 29 May 1943
- Commissioned: 21 August 1943
- Decommissioned: 31 May 1946
- Reclassified: APD-79, 31 July 1944
- Stricken: 1 April 1964
- Honors and awards: 2 battle stars (World War II)
- Fate: Sold for scrapping, 11 May 1965

General characteristics
- Class & type: Buckley-class destroyer escort
- Displacement: 1,400 long tons (1,422 t) light; 1,673 long tons (1,700 t) standard
- Length: 306 ft (93 m)
- Beam: 37 ft (11 m)
- Draft: 13 ft 6 in (4.11 m)
- Propulsion: Turbo-electric drive, 12,000 shp (8.9 MW); 2 shafts
- Speed: 24 knots (44 km/h; 28 mph)
- Boats & landing craft carried: 4 × LCVP landing craft (as APD)
- Troops: 162 troops (as APD)
- Complement: 186
- Armament: As DE : 3 × 3 in (76 mm)/50 caliber guns; 1 × quad 1.1 in (28 mm)/75 caliber gun; 8 × single 20 mm (0.79 in) Oerlikon cannons; 1 × triple 21 in (530 mm) torpedo tubes; 1 × Hedgehog anti-submarine mortar; 8 × K-gun depth charge projectors; 2 × depth charge tracks; As APD : 1 × 5 in (130 mm)/38 caliber gun; 3 × twin 40 mm (1.6 in) Bofors guns; 6 × single 20 mm Oerlikon cannons; 2 × depth charge tracks

USS Bunch (DE-694) was a Buckley-class destroyer escort of the United States Navy, named after Kenneth Cecil Bunch, killed in action on 6 June 1942 while flying as radioman-gunner in an SBD Dauntless dive bomber during the Battle of Midway. Bunch was a native of Norman County, Minnesota.

== Construction ==
Bunch was launched on 29 May 1943, by the Defoe Shipbuilding Company, in Bay City, Michigan, sponsored by Mrs. Kenneth C. Bunch, widow of Aviation Radioman Kenneth Cecil Bunch; and commissioned on 21 August 1943.

== Service history ==
=== Atlantic convoy escort, 1943–1944 ===
After fitting out, Bunch departed Southwest Pass on 12 September 1943. She proceeded via Key West, Florida, and carried out her shakedown training near Bermuda until 15 October when she set course for Boston.

Following post-shakedown availability at the Boston Navy Yard, the warship moved to New York whence she began her escort work on 1 November by shepherding the New York section of Convoy UGS-23 out of coastal waters. That same day, she made a sonar contact and attacked it with two "Hedgehog" patterns, though she later evaluated it as "non-submarine." Released the following day, Bunch proceeded to Hampton Roads, where she reported for duty with Task Force (TF) 23. Over the next eight months, the destroyer escort made six round-trip voyages across the Atlantic escorting convoys between New York and Derry, punctuating that work with refresher training at Casco Bay, Maine, and availabilities at Boston.

=== Conversion to a high-speed transport, 1944 ===
On 28 July, Bunch began conversion to a high speed transport at the Naval Frontier Base, Tompkinsville, Staten Island. Redesignated APD-79 on 31 July 1944, she was also fitted out as a flagship during the 11 weeks of modifications. She completed conversion on 12 October and departed New York on the 13th. Steaming first to Hampton Roads and thence up the Chesapeake Bay, Bunch briefly visited Annapolis, Maryland, before she began training duty in the Bay. Between 23 October and 10 December, Bunch helped to prepare 11 other crews for their service in high-speed transports.

=== Pacific Fleet, 1943–1944 ===
Following an availability at the St. Helena Annex, Bunch departed Norfolk on 20 December 1944 in company with Hopping (APD-51) to escort the transports Anne Arundel (AP-76), Dorothea L. Dix (AP-67) and Lyon (AP-71), to the Canal Zone. Arriving in Panama on Christmas Day 1944, she transited the canal the following day, reported to the Commander in Chief, Pacific Fleet, for duty and ultimately reached San Diego on 3 January 1945. Underway for Hawaii on the 9th, she arrived in Pearl Harbor on the 15th. Bunch then exercised at Maui's Ma'alaea Bay with Underwater Demolition Teams (UDT) 18 and 21. With UDT-21 remaining on board, Bunch sailed for the Marshall Islands on 14 February, arriving at Eniwetok on the 22nd. After fueling, the high-speed transport put to sea the next day in the screen of a convoy of which part was bound for the Western Carolines and the rest for the Philippines. The convoy's Ulithi-bound portion parted company on 28 February, but Bunch remained with the Leyte-bound part and arrived in Tarraguna Anchorage near San Pedro Bay on 4 March.

==== Preparations for Okinawa ====
At Leyte, the warship began preparations to carry out her part in the invasion of Okinawa. After UDT-21 received a briefing on the mission ahead on the 7th, Bunch spent the period 9 to 13 March engaged in exercises at nearby Homonhon Island with seven other high-speed transports and some landing craft. Later, she took part in landing rehearsals on the 14th, conducted tactical exercises in Leyte Gulf early on the 15th, and then joined TG 52.13 in practice lowering and recovering LCP(R)s off Cabugan Grande Island. After a final conference on the upcoming landings on the 20th, Bunch set out for the Ryukyu Islands on the 21st, screening Transport Group "Easy," Western Islands Attack Force (TG 51.1).

==== Invasion of Kerama Islands ====
At 0330 on 26 March 1945, Bunch went to general quarters and proceeded into Transport Area "Easy," five miles west of Kube Shima in the Kerama Retto group of the Ryukyus. Detached at 0500, she and Hopping escorted the attack transport Natrona (APA-214) to her rendezvous with the control boat, SC-1328, in Area "Jig." Relieved of that task at 0600, the pair took up screening stations in the transport area and spent the remainder of the day screening the troopships. That night, she experienced a couple of desultory air attacks. At 0130 on the 27th, Bunch fired on a single enemy plane, which soon disappeared out of range. Securing from battle stations at 0210, the high-speed transport nevertheless remained on the alert. At 0338, she opened fire with her 40-millimeter battery on another intruder approaching on the port quarter. Although the ship went to general quarters, no attack developed, and she stood down at 0400.

Released from the transport screen later in the day, Bunch left TG 52.13's formation early in the first dog watch for a high-speed observation sweep of the objective beaches – White 1, 2, and 3 – on Okinawa. Delays in sweeping the waters off the beaches for mines and the consequent crowding of heavy fire support units on the outer edge of the unswept area prevented Bunch from getting closer than five miles to the objective. She retired from the scene at 1637 to permit the other ships of TG 52.13 to do their own reconnoitering.

After spending the night with the fire support night retirement unit, Bunch went to general quarters for the dawn alert at 0555 on 28 March. From her ringside seat, the fast transport observed Henry A. Wiley (DM-29) splash two Aichi D3A "Val" carrier dive bombers and watched a suicide plane attempt to crash the nearby Crosley (APD-87). Bunch secured from general quarters at 0655 and, after being detached from the night retirement group's screen, moved to cover the fire support units off the main invasion beaches. That assignment occupied her through the afternoon watch and into the first dog watch. At about 1635, the warship left the fire support units for Kerama Retto where she assumed patrol station R-16 off Mae Shima.

At 2314 on 28 March, lookouts sighted enemy planes on Bunch's starboard beam at extreme range, and she immediately went to general quarters. Still, the high-speed transport did not commence firing – on a plane that she identified as a Mitsubishi G4M "Betty" twin-engined bomber – until 0110 on the 29th. Even then, the plane fell to gunfire from the ships astern, and Bunch secured from battle stations soon thereafter. Going back to general quarters for the dawn alert at 0525 on the 29th, Bunch spotted planes at 0605, but they remained out of range.

Just seven minutes later, however, danger approached from an entirely different quarter. Her lookouts and SL radar operator picked up a small boat, 2,200 yards away on the port bow, and Bunch rang up full speed and altered course to investigate. After identifying the boat as enemy, she opened fire with .50-caliber, 20- and 40-millimeter batteries and destroyed it 500 yards away. At 0631, Bunch detected a second suicide motorboat – later judged to have come from Mae Shima, which was still in enemy hands – bearing down upon the ship. Machine gun fire from the fast transport stopped the craft dead in the water, however, and its crew jettisoned the explosive charge which immediately blew up. Bunch altered course to capture the suicide boat's crew, but a nearby destroyer "eradicated" both boat and swimmers with a well-placed 5-inch shell. After reporting the incident, Bunch resumed patrolling until detached at 0730 to await word to execute her pre-landing mission.

In the afternoon of 29 March, she carried out a reconnaissance of the "White" beaches the results of which indicated no need for demolition work there. Accordingly, Bunch retired to seaward and resumed screening until needed elsewhere. At 0645 on 30 March, the high-speed transport left that duty and steamed toward the "Orange" beaches. Lying 5,800 yards off the objective, Bunch put her boats in the water at 0905 and retired to a patrol area to await their return, while LCI(G)s gave close fire support for the demolition operations. The "Orange" beach charges went off at 1137, and Bunch recovered her boats by 1225. After standing by for further orders, she distributed passengers from the command ship Estes (AGC-12) among several other high-speed transports, which then transferred them to ships of the main northern and southern attack forces early the next day. Completing the task at 1700, she cleared Kerama Retto at 1930 and took up patrol station R-7.

Still patrolling her station 17 minutes into the mid-watch on the 31st, Bunch received word of an incoming air raid and reduced speed to 10 knots to hide her wake in the darkness. Not long thereafter, an enemy twin-engined bomber passed along her port side, some 150 yards away. Bunch opened fire with her .50-caliber and 40-millimeter batteries and went to general quarters, but no enemy plane attacked her at that time. Finally, her relief arrived at 0550, and Bunch proceeded with TG 52.13 to transfer a UDT-21 passenger to Mendocino (APA-100). From there, she returned to Kerama Retto with Crosley and Loy (APD-56) and anchored there for the night with her engines on half-hour standby and with an armed watch posted against suicide swimmers.

==== Okinawa landings ====
Underway again at 0254 on 1 April, Bunch cleared Kerama Retto with TG 52.13 and headed east toward the transport area off the Hagushi beaches. Once there, the formation dissolved at 0500, and Bunch steamed to the line of departure to transfer UDT-21 liaison personnel to the "White" beach control vessel, PC-578. Passing south of the transport area and north of the LST area, she accomplished the transfer at 0616 and then cleared the area rapidly to avoid the waves of landing craft forming for the run to the beach.

The warship screened the transports for the remainder of the first day of the Okinawa landings and, after being relieved of that duty the following dawn, visited "White" beach for a conference between UDT-21's commanding officer and the beachmaster on post-assault demolition needs. Bunch then left the beachhead at 1500 and took up night screening station A-20. Around dusk, however, she went to general quarters after observing a small convoy under attack by five enemy planes. Bunch took two of them under fire despite the fact that they were just out of range. One crashed the attack transport Henrico (APA-45), and the other started a run on Bunch but turned away when she opened fire. Instead, he tried to bomb Dickerson (APD-21) but missed. At that point, he turned and crashed Dickerson.

The fire on board Dickerson grew rapidly as Bunch maneuvered to help but was "fairly well under control" by 1930. Seeing that she was "receiving considerable structural damage" alongside the stricken ship, Bunch pulled away but sent a fire and rescue party over in one of her LCPRs. In the meantime, UDT-21 swimmers used their rubber boats to rescue many of the Dickerson survivors forced over the side by the flames. Back on board Dickersion where the fire had burst forth again, Bunch's fire and rescue party – aided by a contingent from Crosley – succeeded in getting gasoline-driven handy-billies in operation to battle them. Bunch passed a towline and three fire hoses across to Dickerson and began to tow her, while men cut away Dickerson's port-side boats to lessen the list. Soon, however, the towline and hoses parted, and the salvagers lost their hard-won gains when the fires broke out with renewed vigor as a result. To make matters worse, a freshening wind made getting another hawser across to her even more difficult. Eventually, Arikara (ATF-98) arrived, took Dickerson in tow, put out her fires, and brought her into Kerama Retto. After screening Arikara and Dickerson to Kerama Retto and transferring 61 survivors to PCE-852, Bunch returned to station A-20 where the rest of the day passed mercifully quietly.

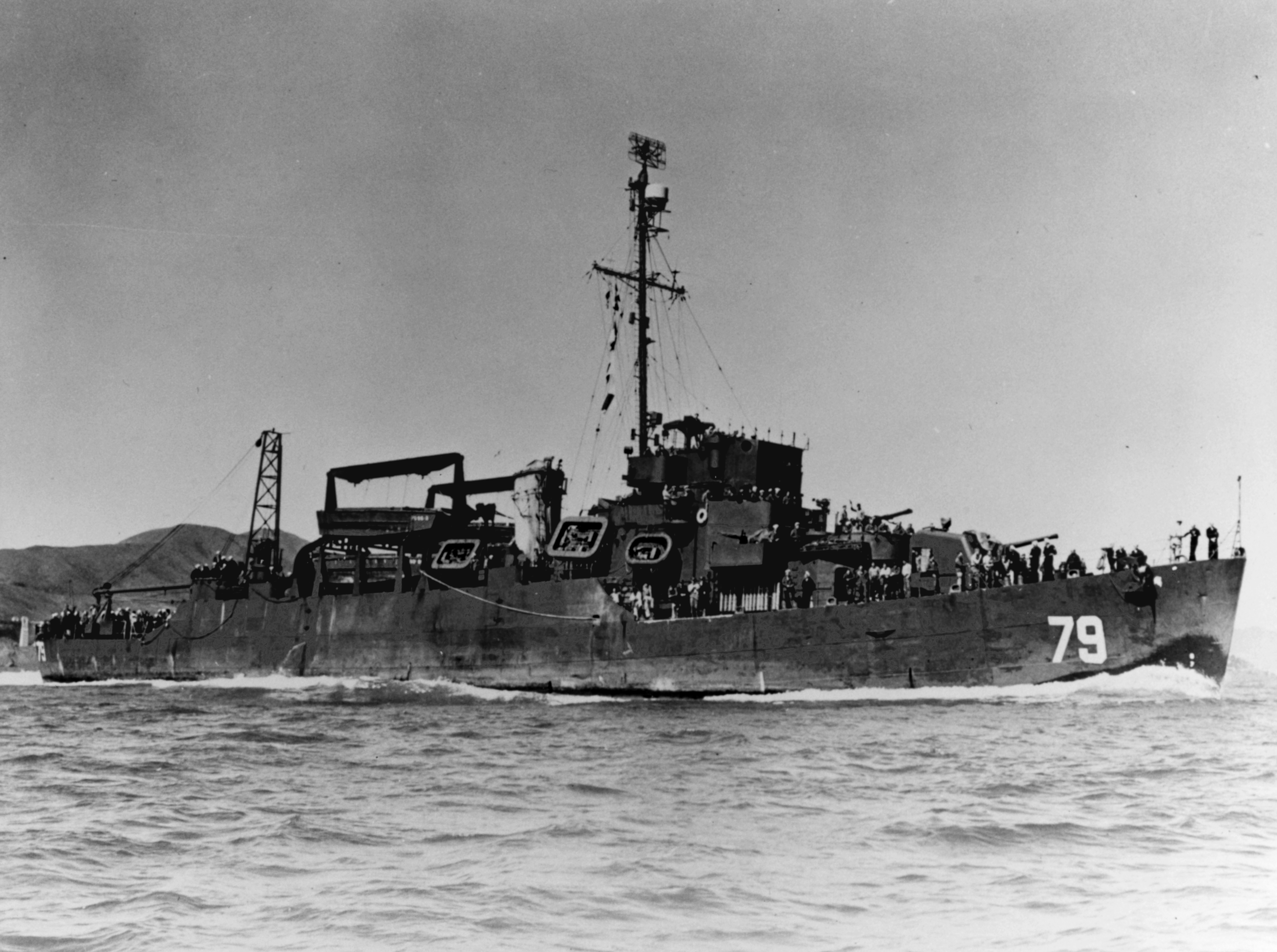
Bunch as a high-speed transport.

On the afternoon of 4 April, Bunch steamed to Kerama Retto where she relieved Gilmer (APD-11) as flagship for TG 52.11 comprising all fast transports present in the Okinawa area. At 1600, the warship departed Kerama Retto to rendezvous with Estes (AGC-12) east of Okinawa for a conference on board the command ship. Bunch then screened Estes until 2300 when she received orders to patrol a station 20 miles south of Mae Shima. That duty lasted until 1045 on 5 April when Bunch rushed to another meeting with Estes. At 1230, she joined the Eastern Islands Bombardment Group, comprising Estes, West Virginia (BB-48), and Arikara. While Bunch screened that unit, the embarked staff of TG 52.11 supervised UDT reconnaissance and demolition operations at the eastern islands and in Nakagusuku Wan (Buckner Bay).

Bunch continued her duties in the screen into the 6th, when she received orders to rendezvous with Eldorado (AGC-11) off Okinawa's western beaches for a conference on board that ship. She remained close by during the conference and, at 1605, received a report of enemy planes in the area. While anti-aircraft fire blossomed in the sky on her port quarter, Bunch spotted a Mitsubishi A6M5 "Zeke" carrier fighter on her starboard quarter at long range. Her starboard 40-millimeter guns took the fighter under fire at a range of 700 yards and soon disintegrated his tail. The "Zeke" then went out of control, splashing into the sea 100 yards from the warship on her port beam. After returning passengers to Estes during the first dog watch, Bunch resumed screening and remained with Estes through the 7th and into the 8th.

Leaving the screen at 1000 on the 8th, she delivered the TG 52.11 staff to a conference on board Vice Admiral Richmond K. Turner's flagship, Eldorado. The staff returned from that meeting just before 1800, and Bunch resumed screening station about an hour later. Another conference – this one on board Panamint (AGC-13) – took her away from the screening station on the 9th, and she returned to Kerama Retto on the 10th to transfer the idle UDT-21 out of harm's way to Appling (APA-58) while it waited for another mission. She spent the rest of the 10th on an auxiliary radar picket station.

==== Ie Shima ====
That same day, Bunch received her orders for the scheduled capture of Ie Shima. On the 11th, she rejoined Panamint to deliver the TG 52.11 staff to confer on the Ie Shima operation and then reembarked UDT-21. Preparations for the Ie Shima mission continued on the 12th, but Bunch finally set out for the objective early on the 13th. Between 0830 and 1100 on the 13th, UDT 21 carried out its reconnaissance of the beach and returned on board Bunch, reporting having met only small arms fire in the course of their work. After yet another conference on board Panamint that night, Bunch returned to Ie Shima the next morning, and UDT-21 resumed its pre-invasion work. That night, the warship retired to Okinawa, and another conference, that time on board Eldorado.

Except for a fuel run to Taluga (AO-62) just before midday, Bunch remained at anchor off Okinawa on the 15th. However, she received a report of enemy aircraft in the vicinity at 1830 and went to battle stations. Opening fire with her 5-inch and 40-millimeter battery, she join a barrage of fire that splashed an enemy plane off the beach. Securing from general quarters at 2000, she again manned battle stations an hour later; and sporadic enemy air activity kept her on alert until 2220. Air attacks on Yontan airfield, however, continued throughout the night.

Early the next day, Bunch returned to Ie Shima where she transferred some UDT-21 men to the beach control vessel, USS PC-1603, for duty guiding the assault boats to their assigned beaches. She then stood out to screen the transports. At 0811, she went to battle stations when she overheard reports of radar picket destroyers to the northwest battling heavy enemy aircraft attacks. At 0935, Bunch spotted two Nakajima B5N Type 97 "Kate" carrier attack planes closing the transport area at low speed. One approached from the northeast, and Bunch joined the nearby transports in splashing that attacker promptly. Thereupon, the second "Kate" fled to the south but fell victim to a Vought F4U Corsair. The warship retrieved the men from UDT-21 late in the afternoon watch and then returned to the Hagushi anchorage. Bunch continued to support UDT-21's operations for the next few days, retiring nightly to Okinawa to anchor, and finally wrapping up post-assault demolition work at Ie Shima on the 20th.

After concluding the Ie Shima operation, the high-speed transport resumed screening duty off the Hagushi beaches on the 21st. That assignment lasted until the 25th when she received orders to join a Ulithi-bound convoy. Early the next day, Bunch rendezvoused with the convoy near the western beaches of Okinawa and set sail for Ulithi. The convoy reached Ulithi just after noon on the 30th, but Bunch returned to sea on 1 May and made Guam early on the 2nd. There, the warship disembarked UDT-21 and then enjoyed an availability between the 3rd and the 17th, while her crew enjoyed recreation parties ashore whenever the work allowed.

==== Iheya Shima ====
Bunch sailed for Okinawa on the 19th, and reached Hagushi on the 22nd. She remained at anchor off Hagushi until the 25th, when she moved to Kerama Retto for a four-day availability to make repairs to her sonar which had failed during the voyage back from Guam. On the 30th, the high-speed transport received orders for her next mission, the occupation of Iheya Shima. Though scheduled to begin early on the 31st, the Iheya Shima operation had to be postponed because of foggy weather. The action finally began on 2 June with Bunch in a standby role. Inclement weather and an excellent combat air patrol (CAP) took care of enemy planes, and Bunch remained at anchor during the night and forenoon. A pair of approaching typhoons, though, compelled the assault group to get underway and seek shelter in the lee provided by a small bay north of the Motobu Peninsula.

Returning to Iheya Shima with the assault group the following morning, Bunch started out for the northern part of the island only to be re-deployed to the assault area where she remained at anchor through the night. The next day, she carried out the reconnaissance of the northern beaches, finding that heavy equipment could be landed there without any demolition work by the UDTs. On 7 June, the high-speed transport escorted a local convoy to Hagushi where, except for a fuel run to Kerama Retto early on the 8th, she remained until setting out to support the occupation of Aguni Shima just after midnight on the 9th.

==== Aguni Shima ====
Bunch sailed for Aguni Shima at 0115 on 9 June, taking some shots at an enemy plane during the passage. The assault group arrived off the objective around 0445, and the landings proceeded against little or no resistance. At 0600, Bunch joined PCE(R)-855 to escort Oak Hill (LSD-7) and LST-95 to Hagushi, returning to Aguni Shima once that brief mission was completed. She remained there until the 11th when she and survey ship Pathfinder (AGS-1) conducted a reconnaissance of Naha Harbor, followed by the necessary charting and demolition operations. She completed that assignment on the 14th and then shifted to Kerama Retto for logistics before starting similar work at Ie Shima. Except for a trip to Hagushi on the 19th for more explosives, the fast transport spent the week from 15 to 22 June at Ie Shima conducting demolition work.

==== Kume Shima ====
Bunch next participated in the assault on Kume Shima on 26 June. Once again, no enemy opposed the landings; and, after UDT-21 concluded its mission getting the LSTs safely into the bay and unloaded, the high-speed transport returned to Hagushi. She then resumed the demolition work at Ie Shima and remained so engaged through the end of the month.

==== Return to the United States ====
On 1 July, the high-speed transport sailed from Okinawa, screening Auburn (AGC-10) to Saipan, where the pair arrived on 5 July. From there, Bunch continued on alone via Eniwetok and Hawaii to the west coast of the United States. She made port at Oceanside, California, on 24 July and disembarked UDT-21 and its gear there. She then shifted berths to begin an overhaul at the Standard Shipbuilding yard in San Pedro. She was just finishing those repairs in mid-August when the war with Japan ended.

=== Post-war activities, 1945–1946 ===
The warship completed post-repair trials late in August, fueled and provisioned early in September and set sail for the western Pacific in company with five other fast transports on the 6th. At 0130 on 10 September, Bunch's air search radar picked up emergency signals, and the group carried out a search for the imperiled plane until receiving word of its safe return from the Commander, Hawaiian Sea Frontier. Bunch reached Pearl Harbor on the afternoon of 12 September.

The following day, Bunch reported to Commander, Mine Force, Pacific (ComMinPac) for duty. Soon thereafter, she began loading five LCPRs equipped to sweep shallow-water moored mines and taking on the men assigned to carry out the minesweeping operations. On 15 September, she embarked on the voyage via Eniwetok back to the Ryukyus. Bunch arrived off Okinawa on the 28th, just in time to rendezvous with Bibb (AGC-31) off Buckner Bay and form part of a typhoon sortie group. The high-speed transport remained at sea with that group until 1 October, when she finally dropped anchor in Buckner Bay.

After loading more minesweeping gear and obtaining fuel and stores, Bunch sailed for Chinese waters on 6 October. Reaching Shanghai on 10 October, the fast transport unloaded cargo to be distributed to the variety of minesweeping craft operating there. She also made voyage repairs while her crew enjoyed liberty in the fabled Far Eastern city. Underway for Okinawa on 16 October, she returned to Buckner Bay on the 18th.

In the next few days, Bunch assisted in the salvage of ships grounded by a succession of typhoons over the past weeks and loaded cargo for her return to Shanghai. Her LCPRs came in handy in the salvage operations despite the effort required to remove and then replace their specialized minesweeping gear. After nearly a week engaged in salvage duty, Bunch got underway for Shanghai on 26 October. She reached her destination on the 28th and spent the rest of October and the first week of November undergoing voyage repairs alongside Dixie (AD-14).

On 8 November 1945, Bunch departed Shanghai for Hangzhou Bay, where she led a small minesweeping and mine disposal unit of three motor minesweepers and two submarine chasers in clearing Japanese mines from a channel twelve miles long and a mile wide. After completing this mission, she departed Hangzhou Bay on 15 November and set course for Okinawa, arriving at Buckner Bay on the 20th. Though she reported to the Commander, Minecraft, Okinawa, Bunch did not remain there for long. After loading cargo, she set out for Formosa on the 26th. The warship reached Keelung, Formosa, the next day and remained there through the end of the month.

Returning to sea on 1 December, Bunch escorted YMS-72 to Shanghai for hull repairs. The ships encountered gale force winds and heavy seas en route but succeeded in weathering the passage. Bunch remained at Shanghai until early on 6 December when she headed back to Kiirun with six motor minesweepers and an LCS. After making her destination on the 9th, she moved to the naval port of Takao, Formosa, on the 11th. There, she discharged cargo until the 12th, when she shifted back to Kiirun. She spent several days there supporting the motor minesweepers actually carrying out the sweep. Her prime function was to provide navigational assistance to the motor minesweepers by lying to about 20 miles north of the harbor entrance and directing them by radar and voice radio.

Completing that task on 18 December, the high-speed transport sailed for Shanghai on the 19th in company with Velocity (AM-128), Threat (AM-124), YMS-259, LCS(L)-58 and two other landing vessels – LC(FF)-45 and LCS(L)-22 – under tow by the larger minesweepers. Bunch served as convoy guide for the passage, which was undertaken to permit the two craft in tow to receive repairs. The high-speed transport and her charges reached Shanghai on 22 December, and Bunch spent the remainder of the month at moored to a succession of buoys in the port. In January 1946, Bunch moved to Taizhou, China, where she carried out minesweeping duties in cooperation with YMS-338, YMS-329, and YMS-366 before shifting to Wenzhou Bay to do a minesweep radar plot. At the completion of these tasks, the high-speed transport set out by way of Hong Kong to return to Okinawa. She entered Buckner Bay on 20 January and began loading Japan-bound minesweeping gear. Bunch reached her first Japanese port of call, Sasebo, on the 26th and then went on to visit Wakayama and Kobe before leaving on 21 February to return to the United States.

=== Decommissioning and sale ===
Steaming by way of Eniwetok and Oahu, Bunch returned to the United States at San Francisco on 14 March 1946. Three days later, she sailed south to San Diego, arriving there on the 20th. Bunch was decommissioned at San Diego on 31 May 1946 and was placed in reserve in July 1947. She never returned to active service. Her name was struck from the Navy List on 1 April 1964, and she was sold for scrap in June 1965.

== Awards ==
Bunch received two battle stars for her World War II service.
