= National Register of Historic Places listings in Sampson County, North Carolina =

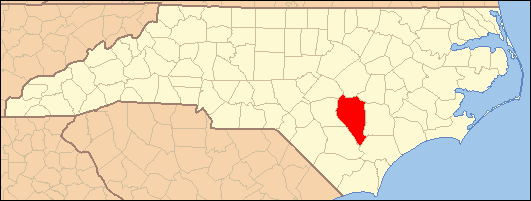

This list includes properties and districts listed on the National Register of Historic Places in Sampson County, North Carolina. Click the "Map of all coordinates" link to the right to view an online map of all properties and districts with latitude and longitude coordinates in the table below.

== Current listings ==
This National Park Service list is complete through NPS recent listings posted April 10, 2026.

	Name on the Register	Image	Date listed	Location	City or town	Description
1	Beatty-Corbett House		March 17, 1986 (#86000549)	SR 701 at SR 1200; 34°33′11″N 78°15′09″W	Ivanhoe	
2	Bethune-Powell Buildings	Bethune-Powell Buildings	March 17, 1986 (#86000580)	118-120 E. Main St. 34°59′52″N 78°19′25″W	Clinton	
3	Asher W. Bizzell House		May 21, 1986 (#86001125)	US 13 and SR 1845; 35°12′35″N 78°24′58″W	Rosin	
4	Black River Presbyterian and Ivanhoe Baptist Churches	Black River Presbyterian and Ivanhoe Baptist Churches	March 17, 1986 (#86000550)	SR 1102 E of SR 1100; 34°36′12″N 78°14′25″W	Ivanhoe	
5	Gen. Thomas Boykin House	Gen. Thomas Boykin House	March 17, 1986 (#86000551)	SR 1214 SW of SR 1222; 34°57′43″N 78°22′26″W	Clinton	
6	Thomas Bullard House		August 25, 2014 (#14000522)	386 Carry Bridge Rd. 34°59′45″N 78°34′01″W	near Autryville	
7	Marion Butler Birthplace		March 17, 1986 (#86000552)	NC 242 at SR 1414; 35°02′25″N 78°27′59″W	Salemburg	
8	Dan E. Caison Sr. House		May 21, 1986 (#86001124)	Broad St. 34°57′11″N 78°30′53″W	Roseboro	
9	Cherrydale		March 17, 1986 (#86000554)	SR 1919 at SR 1952; 35°01′06″N 78°12′06″W	Turkey	
10	Clear Run		March 17, 1986 (#86000548)	NC 411 at Black River; 34°44′23″N 78°15′56″W	Clear Run	
11	Clinton Commercial Historic District	Clinton Commercial Historic District	May 30, 2002 (#02000568)	Roughly bounded by Vance, Elizabeth, Wall, and Sampson Sts. 34°59′51″N 78°19′28″W	Clinton	
12	Clinton Depot	Clinton Depot	March 17, 1986 (#86000555)	W. Elizabeth St. 34°59′46″N 78°19′27″W	Clinton	
13	College Street Historic District	College Street Historic District	March 17, 1986 (#86000553)	600-802 College St. 35°00′00″N 78°19′08″W	Clinton	
14	Dell School Campus	Dell School Campus	May 21, 1986 (#86001126)	US 421 and SR 1003; 34°48′05″N 78°12′54″W	Delway	
15	Delta Farm		March 17, 1986 (#86000556)	SR 1100 N of SR 1105; 34°38′08″N 78°14′24″W	Ivanhoe	
16	Downtown Roseboro Historic District		December 29, 2025 (#100012455)	Roughly bounded by East Street on the east, Pleasant Street on the south, Church Street on the west, and Clinton Street on the north 34°57′10″N 78°30′37″W	Roseboro	
17	William E. Faison House		January 20, 2005 (#04001526)	NC 50 at jct. with NC 1757 (10901 Suttontown Rd.); 35°09′32″N 78°10′18″W	Giddensville	
18	Graves-Stewart House	Graves-Stewart House	September 8, 1983 (#83001913)	600 College St. 35°00′00″N 78°19′10″W	Clinton	
19	Robert Herring House	Robert Herring House	March 17, 1986 (#86000557)	216 Sampson St. 35°00′01″N 78°19′29″W	Clinton	
20	Troy Herring House		March 17, 1986 (#86000558)	Broad St. S of NC 24; 34°57′25″N 78°31′00″W	Roseboro	
21	Lewis Highsmith Farm		March 17, 1986 (#86000559)	US 421 S of NC 41; 34°42′43″N 78°11′17″W	Harrells	
22	Hollingsworth-Hines Farm		March 17, 1986 (#86000547)	SR 1926 S of SR 1004; 34°56′37″N 78°10′05″W	Turkey	
23	Howard-Royal House		March 17, 1986 (#86000561)	202 N. Main St. 35°00′58″N 78°30′12″W	Salemburg	
24	Howell-Butler House		March 17, 1986 (#86000560)	Broad and McLamb Sts. 34°57′02″N 78°30′49″W	Roseboro	
25	Johnson Building	Johnson Building	May 11, 2000 (#00000459)	102-104 E. Main St. 34°59′51″N 78°19′26″W	Clinton	
26	Samuel Johnson House and Cemetery		March 17, 1986 (#86000562)	SR 1157 S of SR 1004; 34°49′09″N 78°19′31″W	Ingold	
27	James Kerr House		March 17, 1986 (#86000563)	SR 1005 S of SR 1007; 34°39′03″N 78°15′31″W	Kerr	
28	Marcheston Killett Farm	Marcheston Killett Farm	March 17, 1986 (#86000564)	SR 1222 N of US 701; 34°56′31″N 78°20′21″W	Clinton	
29	Marshall Kornegay House and Cemetery		March 17, 1986 (#86000565)	SR 1725 and SR 1720; 35°12′33″N 78°12′10″W	Suttontown	
30	James H. Lamb House		March 17, 1986 (#86000566)	SR 1135 N of NC 411; 34°47′10″N 78°20′23″W	Garland	
31	Lovett Lee House		March 17, 1986 (#86000567)	SR 1725 and SR 1730; 35°10′22″N 78°13′01″W	Giddensville	
32	Dr. James O. Matthews Office		March 17, 1986 (#86000568)	SR 1960 S of SR 1004; 34°51′53″N 78°15′12″W	Taylors Bridge	
33	Fleet Matthis Farm		March 17, 1986 (#86000569)	US 421 S of SR 1146; 34°52′01″N 78°16′37″W	Taylors Bridge	
34	Jonas McPhail House and Annie McPhail Store		March 17, 1986 (#86000571)	US 13 E of SR 1845; 35°12′32″N 78°24′58″W	Rosin	
35	Murphy-Lamb House and Cemetery		March 17, 1986 (#86000570)	SR 1135 S of US 701; 34°47′46″N 78°21′36″W	Garland	
36	Oak Plain Presbyterian Church		May 21, 1986 (#86001127)	SR 1943 S of SR 1945; 34°50′17″N 78°10′10″W	Waycross	
37	Livingston Oates Farm		March 17, 1986 (#86000572)	SR 1748 W of NC 403; 35°04′12″N 78°15′28″W	Clinton	
38	Owen Family House and Cemetery		March 17, 1986 (#86000573)	SR 1212 N of SR 1214; 34°53′44″N 78°27′02″W	McDaniels	Destroyed
39	Patrick-Carr-Herring House	Patrick-Carr-Herring House	January 14, 1993 (#92001791)	226 McKoy St. 34°59′58″N 78°19′33″W	Clinton	
40	Pigford House		March 17, 1986 (#86000574)	SR 1751 S of US 701; 35°02′40″N 78°19′29″W	Clinton	
41	Pope House		March 17, 1986 (#86000575)	SR 1146 N of SR 1145; 34°54′51″N 78°18′30″W	Clinton	Burned
42	Francis Pugh House	Francis Pugh House	March 17, 1986 (#86000577)	SR 1751 at NC 403; 35°00′37″N 78°18′08″W	Clinton	
43	Pugh-Boykin House	Pugh-Boykin House	March 17, 1986 (#86000576)	306 Elizabeth St. 34°59′41″N 78°19′31″W	Clinton	
44	Royal-Crumpler-Parker House	Royal-Crumpler-Parker House	March 17, 1986 (#86000578)	512 Sunset Ave. 34°59′52″N 78°19′56″W	Clinton	
45	Dr. John B. Seavey House and Cemetery		May 21, 1986 (#86001128)	SR 1100 S of SR 1007; 34°40′38″N 78°13′03″W	Harrells	
46	Dr. David Dickson Sloan Farm		March 17, 1986 (#86000579)	US 701 N of the South River; 34°46′12″N 78°23′41″W	Garland	
47	Thirteen Oaks		June 7, 1990 (#90000879)	Jct. of US 13 and SR 1647; 35°13′07″N 78°23′50″W	Newton Grove	
48	West Main-North Chesnutt Streets Historic District	West Main-North Chesnutt Streets Historic District	March 17, 1986 (#86000546)	Roughly N. Chesnutt, Fayetteville, and Williams Sts. between W. Main and Margaret Sts. 34°59′47″N 78°19′33″W	Clinton	
49	Isaac Williams House		March 1, 1984 (#84002523)	NC 55; also NC 55 at its junction with NC 50; 35°14′52″N 78°22′55″W	Newton Grove	Second location represents a boundary increase of June 12, 1989
50	John E. Wilson House		March 17, 1986 (#86000545)	SR 1631 at SR 1630; 35°15′37″N 78°30′29″W	Dunn	

== See also ==
- National Register of Historic Places listings in North Carolina
- List of National Historic Landmarks in North Carolina
