= Herring House =

Herring House may refer to:

- Donald Grant Herring Estate, Princeton, New Jersey
- Patrick-Carr-Herring House, Clinton, North Carolina
- Robert Herring House, Clinton, North Carolina
- Needham Whitfield Herring House, Kenansville, North Carolina
- Herring House (La Grange, North Carolina)
- Troy Herring House, Roseboro, North Carolina
