= Pugh House =

Pugh House may refer to:

- Jesse Pickens Pugh Farmstead, Grove Hill, AL, listed on the NRHP in Alabama
- Pugh House (Portland, Arkansas), listed on the NRHP in Arkansas
- Pugh House (Southville, Kentucky), listed on the NRHP in Kentucky
- Francis Pugh House, Clinton, NC, listed on the NRHP in North Carolina
- Pugh-Boykin House, Clinton, NC, listed on the NRHP in North Carolina
- Pugh House (Morrisville, North Carolina), listed on the NRHP in North Carolina
- Pugh-Kittle House, Baltimore, OH, listed on the NRHP in Ohio
- Rider-Pugh House, Kanab, UT, listed on the NRHP in Utah
- Edward Pugh House, Salt Lake City, UT, listed on the NRHP in Utah
- Captain David Pugh House, Hooks Mills, WV, listed on the NRHP in West Virginia
