= Suttontown =

Suttontown may refer to:

- Suttontown, South Australia near Mount Gambier
- Suttontown, North Carolina in Sampson County
