= Dr. David Dickson Sloan Farm =

Historic house in North Carolina, United States

- U.S. National Register of Historic Places
- Location within North Carolina Location within the United States
- Location: SR 1135 S of US 701, near Garland, North Carolina
- Coordinates: 34°47′46″N 78°21′36″W
- Area: 426 acres (172 ha)
- Built: 1849
- Architectural style: Greek Revival
- MPS: Sampson County MRA
- NRHP reference No.: 86000579
- Added to NRHP: March 17, 1986

Dr. David Dickson Sloan Farm is a historic plantation house and complex located near Garland, Sampson County, North Carolina. The house was built about 1849, and is a two-story, five-bay, Greek Revival style frame dwelling. It has a brick pier foundation, low hipped roof, and three-bay pedimented portico supported by Doric order columns. The interior follows a central hall plan. Also on the property are the contributing cook's house (c. 1849), potato cellar (c. 1849), grape arbor, paling fence, garage, and 11 archaeological sites associated with former outbuildings.

It was added to the National Register of Historic Places in 1986.
