= Dennis Owens =

American football player (born 1960)

No. 98
- Position: Nose tackle

Personal information
- Born: February 24, 1960 (age 66); Clinton, North Carolina, U.S.
- Listed height: 6 ft 1 in (1.85 m)
- Listed weight: 257 lb (117 kg)

Career information
- High school: Clinton
- College: NC State
- NFL draft: 1982: undrafted

Career history
- New England Patriots (1982–1986)

Career NFL statistics
- Sacks: 11.5
- Fumble recoveries: 3
- Stats at Pro Football Reference

Dennis Ray Owens (born February 24, 1960) is an American former professional football player who was a nose tackle for five seasons with the New England Patriots of the National Football League (NFL). He played college football for the NC State Wolfpack.
