= Murphy-Lamb House and Cemetery =

Historic site in Sampson County, North Carolina

- U.S. National Register of Historic Places
- Location within North Carolina Location within the United States
- Location: SR 1135 S of US 701, near Garland, North Carolina
- Coordinates: 34°47′46″N 78°21′36″W
- Area: 288.5 acres (116.8 ha)
- Built: c. 1835
- Architectural style: Federal
- MPS: Sampson County MRA
- NRHP reference No.: 86000570
- Added to NRHP: March 17, 1986

Murphy-Lamb House and Cemetery is a historic plantation house located near Garland, Sampson County, North Carolina. The house was built about 1835, and is a two-story, five bay by two bay, single pile Federal style frame dwelling. It has a brick pier foundation, side gable roof, and engaged front porch with a shed roof and engaged rear shed. The interior follows a hall-and-parlor plan. Also on the property is the contributing family cemetery. It is identical in form to the Samuel Johnson House.

It was added to the National Register of Historic Places in 1986.
