= South River Presbyterian Church =

Historic church in North Carolina, United States

- U.S. National Register of Historic Places
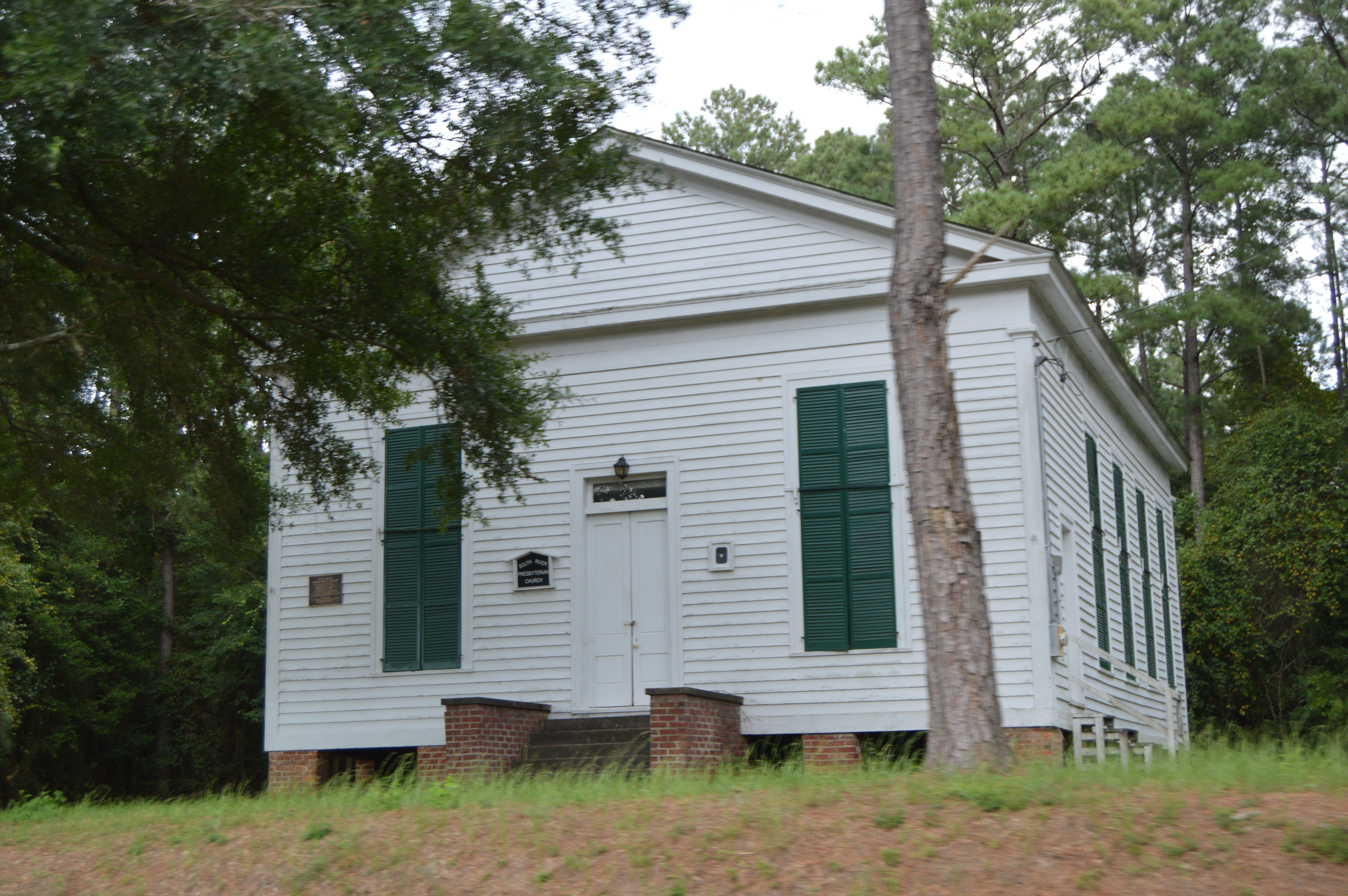
- Front and southeastern side

- Location within North Carolina Location within the United States
- Location: NE side of NC 210, 1.7 miles SE of jct. with US 701, near Garland, North Carolina
- Coordinates: 34°43′48″N 78°24′3″W
- Area: 2 acres (0.81 ha)
- Built: 1855-1857
- Built by: T.A. Parker
- Architectural style: Greek Revival
- NRHP reference No.: 96000563
- Added to NRHP: May 23, 1996

South River Presbyterian Church is a historic Presbyterian church located near Garland, Bladen County, North Carolina. It was built between 1855 and 1857, and is a one-story, rectangular frame Greek Revival-style church. It has a pedimented roof and is sheathed in weatherboard.

It was added to the National Register of Historic Places in 1996.
