= Turkey, North Carolina =

- Town
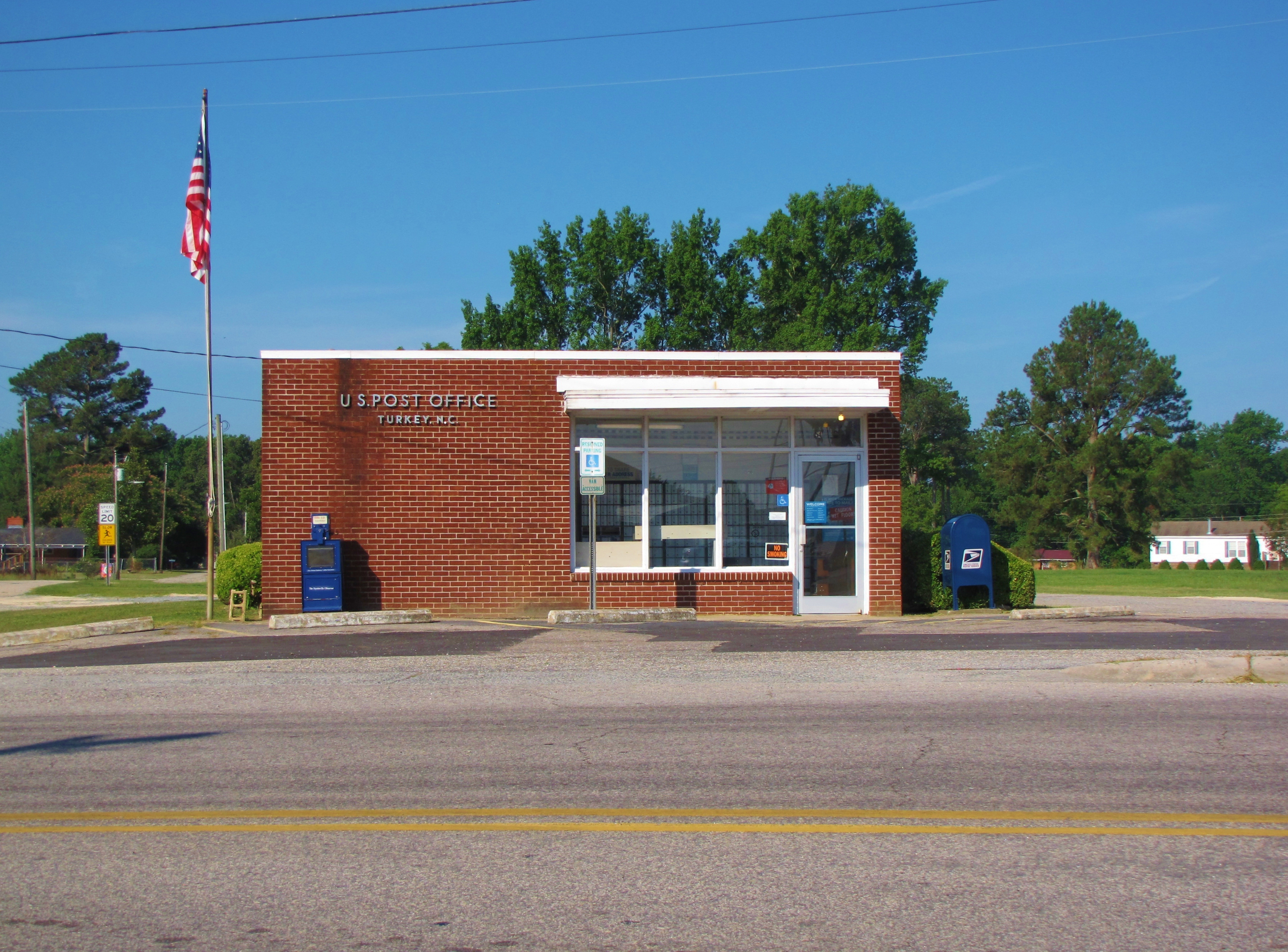
- Post office

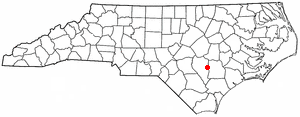
- Location within the state of North Carolina
- Coordinates: 34°59′42″N 78°11′03″W
- Country: United States
- State: North Carolina
- County: Sampson

Area
  - Total: 0.40 sq mi (1.03 km^{2})
  - Land: 0.40 sq mi (1.03 km^{2})
  - Water: 0 sq mi (0.00 km^{2})
- Elevation: 148 ft (45 m)

Population (2020)
  - Total: 213
  - Density: 537.2/sq mi (207.42/km^{2})
- Time zone: UTC-5 (Eastern (EST))
  - Summer (DST): UTC-4 (EDT)
- ZIP code: 28393
- Area codes: 910, 472
- FIPS code: 37-68740
- GNIS feature ID: 2406768
- Website: https://townofturkeync.com/

Turkey is a town in Sampson County, North Carolina, United States. The population was 213 at the 2020 census.

Turkey is located 8 miles east of Clinton.

== History ==
The name of the town was once Springville. During the town's early history, a large group of wild turkey moved into the area, and the people regarded that as a sign. The town's post office sometimes has received mail intended for the Republic of Turkey. At one time, the post office received letters from stamp collectors asking for a Thanksgiving Day postmark.

Cherrydale and the Hollingsworth-Hines Farm were added to the National Register of Historic Places in 1986.

== Geography ==
According to the United States Census Bureau, the town has a total area of 0.4 square mile (1.0 km^{2}), all land.

== Demographics ==
Historical population
Census	Pop.	Note	%±
1920	146		—
1930	213		45.9%
1940	188		−11.7%
1950	223		18.6%
1960	199		−10.8%
1970	329		65.3%
1980	417		26.7%
1990	234		−43.9%
2000	262		12.0%
2010	292		11.5%
2020	213		−27.1%
U.S. Decennial Census

As of the census of 2000, there were 262 people, 93 households, and 70 families residing in the town. The population density was 657.1 people per square mile (253.7 people/km^{2}). There were 105 housing units at an average density of 263.3 per square mile (101.7/km^{2}). The racial makeup of the town was 77.10% White, 18.70% African American, 1.53% Asian, 1.91% from other races, and 0.76% from two or more races. Hispanic or Latino of any race were 3.44% of the population.

There were 93 households, out of which 31.2% had children under the age of 18 living with them, 64.5% were married couples living together, 9.7% had a female householder with no husband present, and 24.7% were non-families. 22.6% of all households were made up of individuals, and 15.1% had someone living alone who was 65 years of age or older. The average household size was 2.82 and the average family size was 3.34.

In the town, the population was spread out, with 27.5% under the age of 18, 6.1% from 18 to 24, 26.7% from 25 to 44, 21.4% from 45 to 64, and 18.3% who were 65 years of age or older. The median age was 38 years. For every 100 females, there were 92.6 males. For every 100 females age 18 and over, there were 86.3 males.

The median income for a household in the town was $19,107, and the median income for a family was $23,125. Males had a median income of $35,313 versus $21,875 for females. The per capita income for the town was $10,622. About 25.8% of families and 35.0% of the population were below the poverty line, including 49.2% of those under the age of eighteen and 51.7% of those 65 or over.
