= James H. Lamb House =

Historic house in North Carolina, United States

- U.S. National Register of Historic Places
- Location within North Carolina Location within the United States
- Location: SR 1135 N of NC 411, near Garland, North Carolina
- Coordinates: 34°47′10″N 78°20′23″W
- Area: 475 acres (192 ha)
- Built: c. 1835
- Architectural style: Greek Revival
- MPS: Sampson County MRA
- NRHP reference No.: 86000566
- Added to NRHP: March 17, 1986

James H. Lamb House is a historic plantation house and complex located near Garland, Sampson County, North Carolina. The house was built about 1835, and is a 2 1/2-story, side hall plan, Greek Revival style frame dwelling. Also on the property are a number of contributing resources including a mule barn, smokehouse, wash house, dairy, corn crib, garage / carriage house, tobacco barns, she, and a family cemetery.

It was added to the National Register of Historic Places in 1986.
