= Ingold, North Carolina =

- CDP
- Location within the state of North Carolina
- Coordinates: 34°49′53″N 78°20′59″W
- Country: United States
- State: North Carolina
- County: Sampson

Area
  - Total: 5.19 sq mi (13.44 km^{2})
  - Land: 5.18 sq mi (13.42 km^{2})
  - Water: 0.012 sq mi (0.03 km^{2})
- Elevation: 105 ft (32 m)

Population (2020)
  - Total: 416
  - Density: 80/sq mi (31/km^{2})
- Time zone: UTC-5 (Eastern (EST))
  - Summer (DST): UTC-4 (EDT)
- ZIP code: 28446
- Area codes: 910, 472
- FIPS code: 37-33640
- GNIS feature ID: 2402614

Ingold is a census-designated place (CDP) in Sampson County, North Carolina, United States. The population was 416 at the 2020 census.

== History ==
The Samuel Johnson House and Cemetery was added to the National Register of Historic Places in 1986.

== Geography ==
According to the United States Census Bureau, the CDP has a total area of 5.2 square miles (13 km^{2}), of which 5.2 square miles (13 km^{2}) is land and 0.19% is water.

== Demographics ==
Historical population
Census	Pop.	Note	%±
2020	416		—
U.S. Decennial Census

As of the census of 2000, there were 484 people, 163 households, and 118 families residing in the CDP. The population density was 93.8 people per square mile (36.2 people/km^{2}). There were 181 housing units at an average density of 35.1 per square mile (13.6/km^{2}). The racial makeup of the CDP was 39.05% White, 26.86% African American, 33.26% from other races, and 0.83% from two or more races. Hispanic or Latino of any race were 41.74% of the population.

There were 163 households, out of which 36.8% had children under the age of 18 living with them, 53.4% were married couples living together, 14.1% had a female householder with no husband present, and 27.0% were non-families. 24.5% of all households were made up of individuals, and 10.4% had someone living alone who was 65 years of age or older. The average household size was 2.97 and the average family size was 3.48.

In the CDP, the population was spread out, with 28.9% under the age of 18, 14.9% from 18 to 24, 29.1% from 25 to 44, 16.5% from 45 to 64, and 10.5% who were 65 years of age or older. The median age was 28 years. For every 100 females, there were 103.4 males. For every 100 females age 18 and over, there were 98.8 males.

The median income for a household in the CDP was $46,429, and the median income for a family was $55,000. Males had a median income of $30,469 versus $30,972 for females. The per capita income for the CDP was $15,032. About 14.4% of families and 16.7% of the population were below the poverty line, including 18.1% of those under age 18 and 44.4% of those age 65 or over.

== Churches ==
1. Ingold First Baptist Church
2. Misión Católica de San Juan Diego
