= Fleet Matthis Farm =

Historic farm in North Carolina, United States

- U.S. National Register of Historic Places
- Location within North Carolina Location within the United States
- Location: US 421 S of SR 1146., near Taylors Bridge, North Carolina
- Coordinates: 34°52′01″N 78°16′37″W
- Area: 297 acres (120 ha)
- Built: c. 1830
- Architectural style: Federal
- MPS: Sampson County MRA
- NRHP reference No.: 86000569
- Added to NRHP: March 17, 1986

Fleet Matthis Farm was a historic home and farm complex located near Taylors Bridge, Sampson County, North Carolina. It was built c. 1830, and was a tall two-story, single-pile, frame dwelling with Federal style design elements. It had a gable roof, a full-width double-tier front porch, and rear shed rooms. Also on the property are three contributing outbuildings, a cemetery, and 15 known sites of outbuildings. It has been demolished.

It was added to the National Register of Historic Places in 1986.
