= James Kerr House =

Historic house in North Carolina, United States

- U.S. National Register of Historic Places
- Location within North Carolina Location within the United States
- Location: SR 1005 S of SR 1007, near Kerr, North Carolina
- Coordinates: 35°39′03″N 78°15′31″W
- Area: 282.4 acres (114.3 ha)
- Built: 1844
- Built by: Isaac B. Kelly
- Architectural style: Greek Revival
- MPS: Sampson County MRA
- NRHP reference No.: 86000563
- Added to NRHP: March 17, 1986

James Kerr House is a historic plantation house located near Kerr, Sampson County, North Carolina. The house was built in 1844, and is a 2 1/2-story, five bay by two bay, Greek Revival style frame dwelling. It has a gable roof, 2 1/2-story rear ell, brick pier foundation, and a pillared double-tier porch central porch. The interior is center-hall in plan. The house is attributed to builder Isaac B. Kelly, who also built the Dr. John B. Seavey House. Also on the property are the contributing original detached kitchen and frame smokehouse.

It was added to the National Register of Historic Places in 1986.
