= Thomas Bullard House =

Historic house in North Carolina, United States

- U.S. National Register of Historic Places
- Location within North Carolina Location within the United States
- Location: 386 Carry Bridge Rd., near Autryville, North Carolina
- Coordinates: 34°59′45″N 78°34′01″W
- Area: 19.24 acres (7.79 ha)
- Built: c. 1856
- Architectural style: Greek Revival, Federal
- NRHP reference No.: 14000522
- Added to NRHP: August 25, 2014

Thomas Bullard House is a historic home located near Autryville, Sampson County, North Carolina. It was built in 1856, and is a two-story, double-pile, transitional Greek Revival / Federal style frame dwelling. It has a hipped roof, replacement one-story front porch built in the 1950s, and a one-story rear ell. The interior has a formal, center-hall plan. Also on the property is the contributing smokehouse (1856) and family cemetery (1862-1991).

It was added to the National Register of Historic Places in 2014.
