= William E. Faison House =

Historic house in North Carolina, United States

- U.S. National Register of Historic Places
- Location within North Carolina Location within the United States
- Location: NC 50 at jct. with NC 1757 (10901 Suttontown Rd.), near Giddensville, North Carolina
- Coordinates: 35°9′32″N 78°10′18″W
- Area: 2.8 acres (1.1 ha)
- Built: c. 1870
- Built by: Aubyne Lewis
- Architectural style: Greek Revival, Italianate
- NRHP reference No.: 04001526
- Added to NRHP: January 20, 2005

William E. Faison House is a historic home located near Giddensville in Sampson County, North Carolina. It was built about 1870, and is a two-story, double-pile, frame dwelling, with Greek Revival and Italianate style design elements. It has a hipped roof; one-story, gable roofed rear ell; and features a one-story front porch. Also on the property is the contributing family cemetery (c. 1904).

It was added to the National Register of Historic Places in 2005.
