= Clear Run, North Carolina =

- Clear Run
- U.S. National Register of Historic Places
- Location within North Carolina Location within the United States
- Location: NC 411 at Black River
- Coordinates: 35°02′25″N 78°27′59″W
- Area: 1,440 acres (580 ha)
- Built: c. 1870
- Architectural style: Colonial Revival
- MPS: Sampson County MRA
- NRHP reference No.: 86000548
- Added to NRHP: March 17, 1986

Clear Run is a historic rural crossroads community located on the Black River in Sampson County, North Carolina. The community includes 22 contributing buildings and 6 contributing sites. Notable contributing resources include the Marvin Johnson House (c. 1898), Federal Herring House (1830s), the Colonial Revival style A. J. Johnson House (1909), Clear Run Grocery, furniture store (c. 1870), cotton gin, and the remains of the steamer A. J. Johnson.

It was added to the National Register of Historic Places in 1986.
