= Hollingsworth–Hines Farm =

Historic farm in North Carolina, United States

- U.S. National Register of Historic Places
- U.S. Historic district
- Location within North Carolina Location within the United States
- Location: SR 1926 S of SR 1004, near Turkey, North Carolina
- Coordinates: 34°56′37″N 78°10′5″W
- Area: 80 acres (32 ha)
- Built: c. 1790
- Architectural style: Two-story log house
- MPS: Sampson County MRA
- NRHP reference No.: 86000547
- Added to NRHP: March 17, 1986

Hollingsworth–Hines Farm is a historic home and farm complex and national historic district located near Turkey, Sampson County, North Carolina. The house was built between 1785 and 1800, and is a two-story, log dwelling with a later rear ell. Also on the property are a number of contributing farm outbuildings, most notable are two log smokehouses, the large six stall barn, two handsome packhouses, a very unusual arrangement of three connected tobacco barns and the family cemetery.

It was added to the National Register of Historic Places in 1986.
