= Pope House =

Historic house in North Carolina, United States

- U.S. National Register of Historic Places
- Location within North Carolina Location within the United States
- Location: SR 1146 N of SR 1145, near Clinton, North Carolina
- Coordinates: 35°54′51″N 78°18′30″W
- Area: 222.2 acres (89.9 ha)
- Built: c. 1846
- Architectural style: Federal
- MPS: Sampson County MRA
- NRHP reference No.: 86000575
- Added to NRHP: March 17, 1986

Pope House was a historic home located near Clinton, Sampson County, North Carolina. It was built about 1846, and was a 1 1/2-story, three bay by two bay, central hall plan, frame dwelling with a Late Federal style interior. It had a side gable roof, rear ell with an enlarged porch, and a gable front porch supported by four Tuscan order columns. It has been demolished.

It was added to the National Register of Historic Places in 1986.
