= Bethune-Powell Buildings =

Historic buildings in North Carolina, US

- U.S. National Register of Historic Places
- U.S. Historic district – Contributing property
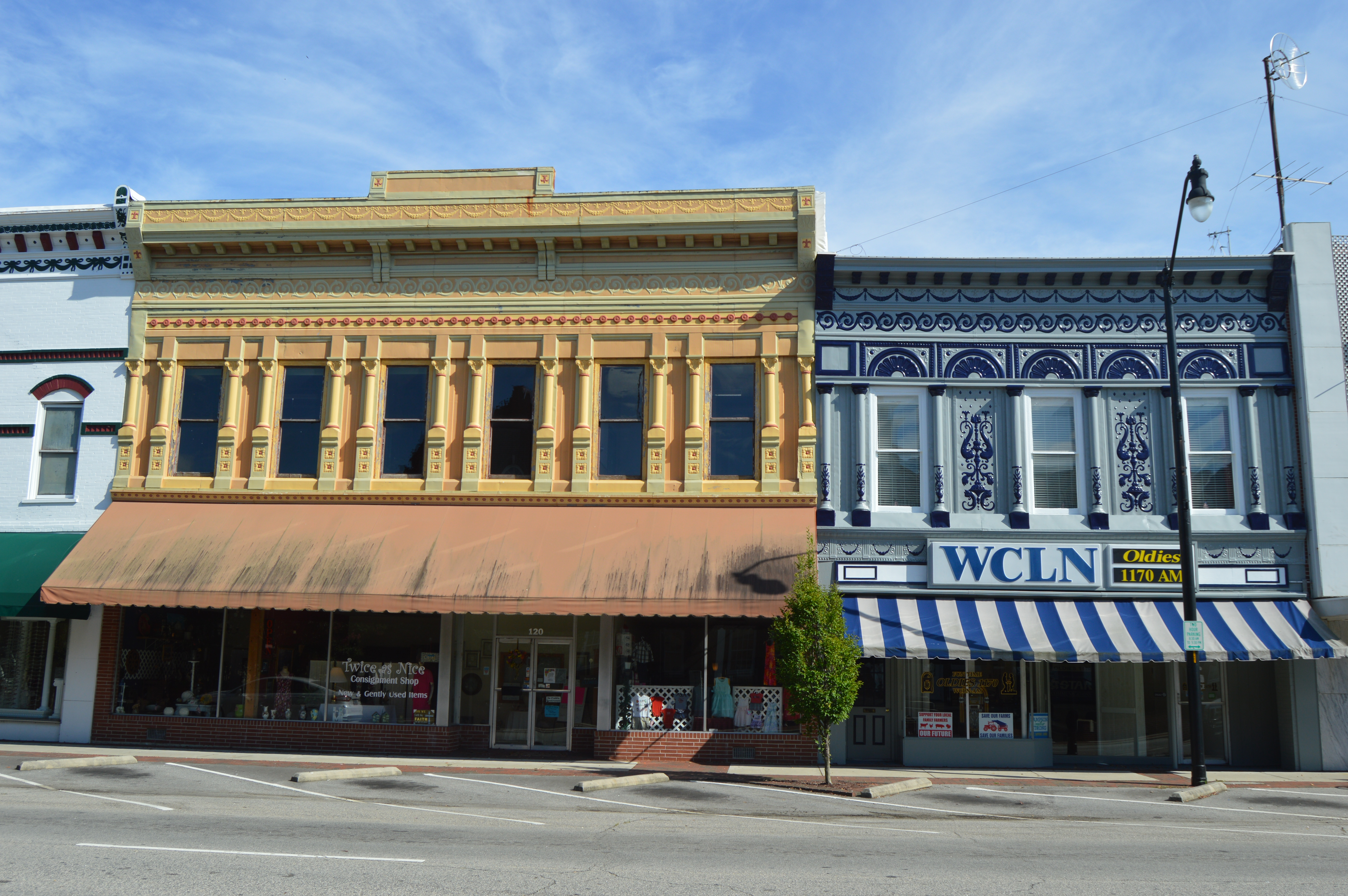
- Facade

- Location within North Carolina Location within the United States
- Location: 118-120 E. Main St., Clinton, North Carolina
- Coordinates: 34°59′38″N 78°19′26″W
- Area: less than one acre
- Built: 1902
- MPS: Sampson County MRA
- NRHP reference No.: 86000580
- Added to NRHP: March 17, 1986

Bethune-Powell Buildings are two historic commercial buildings located at Clinton, Sampson County, North Carolina. They were built in 1902, and are two-story, brick buildings with decorative pressed metal sheathing and brick cornices on the front facade. The Bethune Building is six bays wide and the Powell Building three bays wide. The pressed metal sheathing features a robust pattern of colonnaded, arched garland friezes, and modillion cornice. The buildings were constructed following a fire that destroyed much of the Clinton commercial district.

It was added to the National Register of Historic Places in 1986. They are located in the Clinton Commercial Historic District.
