= Johnson Building =

Historic commercial building in North Carolina, US

- U.S. National Register of Historic Places
- U.S. Historic district – Contributing property
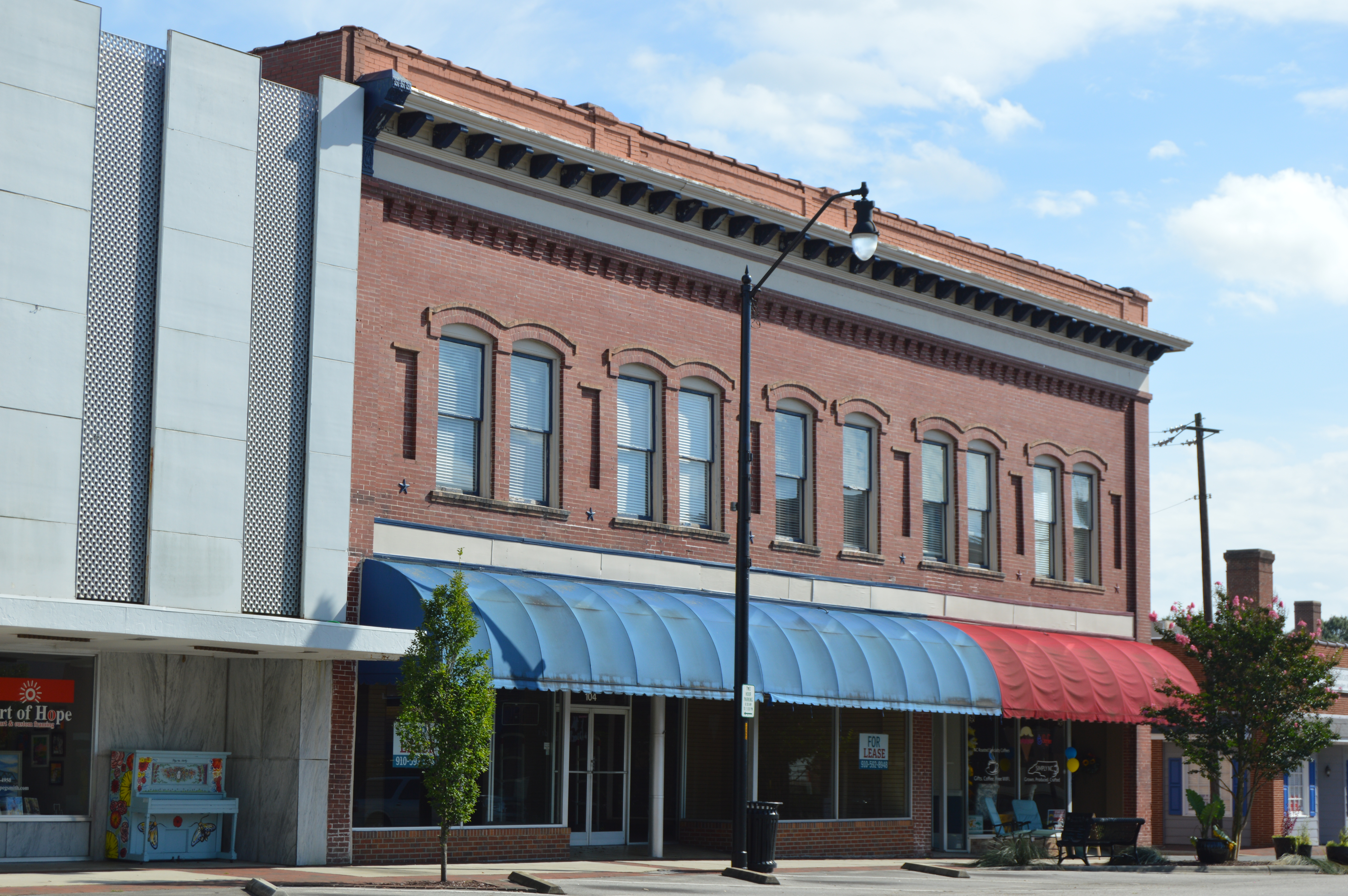
- Facade

- Location within North Carolina Location within the United States
- Location: 102-104 E. Main St., Clinton, North Carolina
- Coordinates: 34°59′51″N 78°19′27″W
- Area: less than one acre
- Built: c. 1902
- Architectural style: Early Commercial
- NRHP reference No.: 00000459
- Added to NRHP: May 11, 2000

Johnson Building is a historic commercial building located at Clinton, Sampson County, North Carolina. It was built about 1902, and is two-story, five bay by eight bay, brick building with Classical Revival-style details. The front facade features arched windows, brick corner pilasters, recessed brick panels, decorative metal cornice, and a raised parapet. The building was constructed following a fire that destroyed much of the Clinton commercial district.

It was added to the National Register of Historic Places in 2000. It is located in the Clinton Commercial Historic District.
