= Marshall Kornegay House and Cemetery =

Historic site in Sampson County, North Carolina, US

- U.S. National Register of Historic Places
- Location within North Carolina Location within the United States
- Location: SR 1725 and SR 1720, Suttontown, North Carolina
- Coordinates: 35°12′33″N 78°12′10″W
- Area: 46.7 acres (18.9 ha)
- Built: c. 1835
- Architectural style: Greek Revival, Federal
- MPS: Sampson County MRA
- NRHP reference No.: 86000565
- Added to NRHP: March 17, 1986

Marshall Kornegay House and Cemetery is a historic plantation house located near Suttontown, Sampson County, North Carolina. The house was built about 1835, and is a 2 1/2-story, four bay by three bay, transitional Federal / Greek Revival style frame dwelling. It has a gable roof, rear ell, and one-story hip roofed front porch. The interior follows a hall-and-parlor plan. The house was restored in 1980–1981. Also on the property is a contributing family cemetery.

It was added to the National Register of Historic Places in 1986.
