= Owen Family House and Cemetery =

Historic site in Sampson County, North Carolina, US

- U.S. National Register of Historic Places
- Location within North Carolina Location within the United States
- Location: SR 1212 N of SR 1214, near McDaniels, North Carolina
- Coordinates: 34°53′44″N 78°27′02″W
- Area: 400 acres (160 ha)
- Built: c. 1800
- Architectural style: Greek Revival, Federal
- MPS: Sampson County MRA
- NRHP reference No.: 86000573
- Added to NRHP: March 17, 1986

The Owen Family House and Cemetery was a historic home located near McDaniels, Sampson County, North Carolina. The original house was built in about 1800, and was a one-room log dwelling sheathed in weatherboard. A second house on the property consists of a Greek Revival style main block attached to a large, early-19th-century, Federal style coastal cottage with engaged porch and rear shed rooms. The front of the main block featured a gable-front porch form supported by four pillars with vernacular Doric order capitals. Also on the property was a contributing brick potato house and a family cemetery. The house has been demolished.

It was added to the National Register of Historic Places in 1986.
