= Delway, North Carolina =

- CDP
- Location within the state of North Carolina
- Coordinates: 34°48′37″N 78°13′01″W
- Country: United States
- State: North Carolina
- County: Sampson

Area
  - Total: 9.62 sq mi (24.92 km^{2})
  - Land: 9.61 sq mi (24.89 km^{2})
  - Water: 0.012 sq mi (0.03 km^{2})
- Elevation: 128 ft (39 m)

Population (2020)
  - Total: 150
  - Density: 15.6/sq mi (6.03/km^{2})
- Time zone: UTC-5 (Eastern (EST))
  - Summer (DST): UTC-4 (EDT)
- FIPS code: 37-16860
- GNIS feature ID: 2402403

Delway is a census-designated place (CDP) in Sampson County, North Carolina, United States. The population was 150 at the 2020 census.

== History ==
The Dell School Campus was added to the National Register of Historic Places in 1986.

== Geography ==
According to the United States Census Bureau, the CDP has a total area of 9.6 square miles (25 km^{2}), of which 9.6 square miles (25.0 km^{2}) is land and 0.10% is water.

== Demographics ==
Historical population
Census	Pop.	Note	%±
2020	150		—
U.S. Decennial Census

As of the census of 2000, there were 270 people, 88 households, and 66 families residing in the CDP. The population density was 28.0 inhabitants per square mile (10.8/km^{2}). There were 101 housing units at an average density of 10.5/sq mi (4.0/km^{2}). The racial makeup of the CDP was 50.00% White, 21.11% African American, 0.37% Native American, 2.22% Pacific Islander, 25.93% from other races, and 0.37% from two or more races. Hispanic or Latino of any race were 31.48% of the population.

There were 88 households, out of which 44.3% had children under the age of 18 living with them, 51.1% were married couples living together, 17.0% had a female householder with no husband present, and 23.9% were non-families. 21.6% of all households were made up of individuals, and 10.2% had someone living alone who was 65 years of age or older. The average household size was 3.07 and the average family size was 3.55.

In the CDP, the population was spread out, with 33.0% under the age of 18, 14.1% from 18 to 24, 27.0% from 25 to 44, 16.3% from 45 to 64, and 9.6% who were 65 years of age or older. The median age was 27 years. For every 100 females, there were 98.5 males. For every 100 females age 18 and over, there were 92.6 males.

The median income for a household in the CDP was $36,538, and the median income for a family was $38,000. Males had a median income of $26,000 versus $15,000 for females. The per capita income for the CDP was $11,268. About 7.9% of families and 7.0% of the population were below the poverty line, including 7.6% of those under the age of eighteen and none of those 65 or over.
