= Oak Plain Presbyterian Church =

Historic church in North Carolina, United States

- U.S. National Register of Historic Places
- Location within North Carolina Location within the United States
- Location: SR 1943 S of SR 1945, near Waycross, North Carolina
- Coordinates: 34°50′17″N 78°10′10″W
- Area: less than one acre
- Built: 1859
- Architectural style: Greek Revival
- MPS: Sampson County MRA
- NRHP reference No.: 86001127
- Added to NRHP: May 21, 1986

Oak Plain Presbyterian Church is a historic Presbyterian church located near Waycross, Sampson County, North Carolina, United States. It was built in 1859, and is a one-story, three-bay-by-three bay, temple form, Greek Revival style frame church. A steeple was added to the church building in 1976. Also on the property is the contributing church cemetery.

It was added to the National Register of Historic Places in 1986.
