= Dell School Campus =

Historic school building in North Carolina, United States

- U.S. National Register of Historic Places
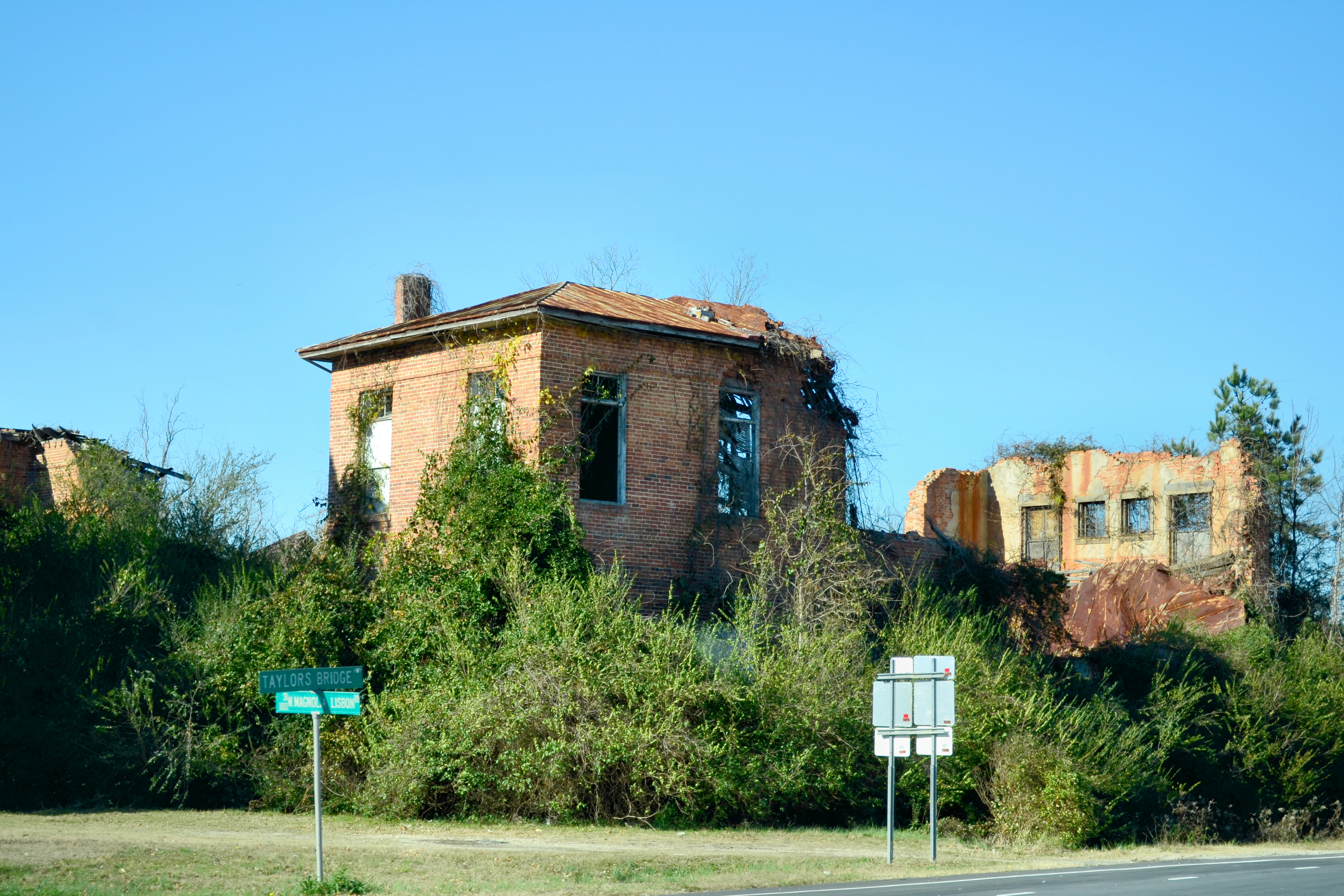
- Dell School, December 2011

- Location within North Carolina Location within the United States
- Location: US 421 and SR 1003, Delway, North Carolina
- Coordinates: 34°48′05″N 78°12′54″W
- Area: 15 acres (6.1 ha)
- Built: 1902-1908
- Architectural style: Colonial Revival, Queen Anne
- MPS: Sampson County MRA
- NRHP reference No.: 86001126
- Added to NRHP: May 21, 1986

Dell School Campus was a historic school campus located at Delway, Sampson County, North Carolina. The campus included five surviving structures built between 1902 and 1908. They were the Dell Academy Building, the Principal's House, the greatly reduced and altered Girls Club/Dormitory (1902, 1908), the Carlton-Alderman House (1902), and the Beach-Alderman House (1902–1903). The Dell Academy Building was built in 1908, and was a two-story, Colonial Revival-style brick building measuring 100 feet wide and 70 feet deep. The Principal's House was built in 1903, and is a two-story, three-bay-by-two-bay, Queen Anne style frame dwelling. The Dell School opened in 1902, was a part of the state system of Baptist secondary schools from 1909 until 1922; it closed in 1923.

It was added to the National Register of Historic Places in 1986. The main academy building fell into disrepair and was demolished in the 2010s. The site has been cleared and remains vacant.
