= Dr. John B. Seavey House and Cemetery =

Historic site in Sampson County, North Carolina, US

- U.S. National Register of Historic Places
- Location within North Carolina Location within the United States
- Location: SR 1100 S of SR 1007, near Harrells, North Carolina
- Coordinates: 34°40′38″N 78°13′03″W
- Area: 107 acres (43 ha)
- Built: 1841
- Built by: Isaac B. Kelly
- Architectural style: Greek Revival
- MPS: Sampson County MRA
- NRHP reference No.: 86001128
- Added to NRHP: May 21, 1986

Dr. John B. Seavey House and Cemetery is a historic plantation house located near Harrells, Sampson County, North Carolina. The house was built in 1841, and is a 2 1/2-story, single pile, Greek Revival style frame dwelling. The front facade features a two-tier front portico. The interior follows a central hall plan. The house is attributed to builder Isaac B. Kelly, who also built the James Kerr House. Also on the property are the contributing grape arbor, a smokehouse, a barn, and family cemetery, which are the only surviving outbuildings.

It was added to the National Register of Historic Places in 1986.
