= Livingston Oates Farm =

Historic farm in North Carolina, United States

- U.S. National Register of Historic Places
- Location within North Carolina Location within the United States
- Location: SR 1748 W of NC 403, near Clinton, North Carolina
- Coordinates: 35°4′12″N 78°15′28″W
- Area: 5.8 acres (2.3 ha)
- Built: c. 1875
- Architectural style: Greek Revival
- MPS: Sampson County MRA
- NRHP reference No.: 86000572
- Added to NRHP: March 17, 1986

Livingston Oates Farm is a historic home and farm located near Clinton, Sampson County, North Carolina. The house was built about 1875, and is a one-story, double pile, Greek Revival style frame dwelling. It has a cross gable roof, rear ell, brick pier foundation, and a dominant front, pedimented, central porch. The interior is center-hall in plan. Also on the property are the contributing commissary, center aisle barn and stable, packhouse, an early gas pump, root cellar, tractor shed, and family cemetery.

It was added to the National Register of Historic Places in 1986.
