= Clinton Commercial Historic District (Clinton, North Carolina) =

Historic district in North Carolina, United States

- U.S. National Register of Historic Places
- U.S. Historic district
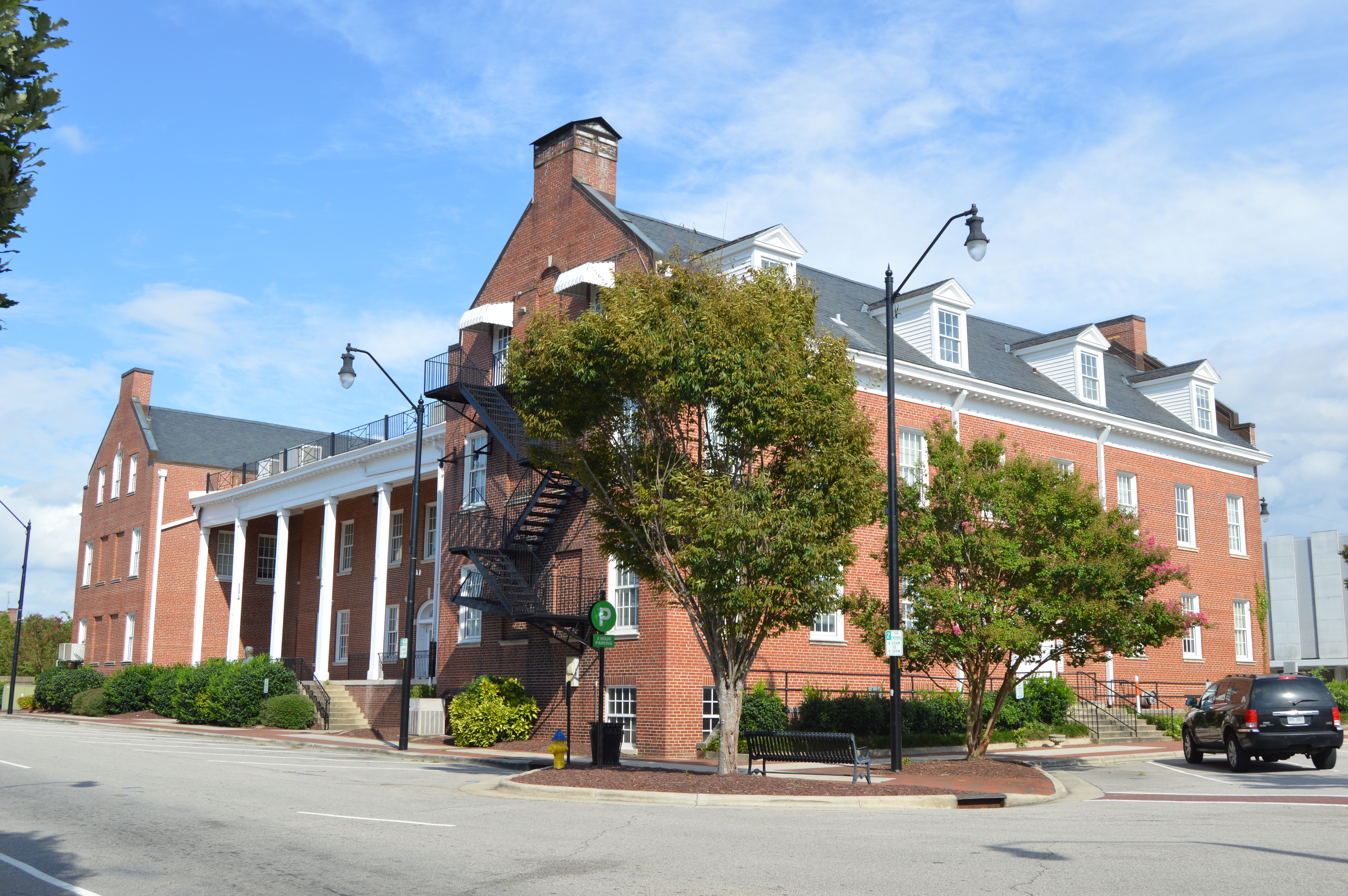
- Sampson County Courthouse

- Location within North Carolina Location within the United States
- Location: Roughly bounded bu Vance, Elizabeth, Wall, and Sampson Sts., Clinton, North Carolina
- Coordinates: 34°59′51″N 78°19′28″W
- Area: 30 acres (12 ha)
- Built: 1902
- Architect: R.R. Markley, Louis A. Simon
- Architectural style: Late 19th And 20th Century Revivals, Late 19th And Early 20th Century American Movements
- NRHP reference No.: 02000568
- Added to NRHP: May 30, 2002

Clinton Commercial Historic District is a national historic district located at Clinton, Sampson County, North Carolina. The district encompasses 67 contributing buildings and 4 contributing objects in the central business district of Clinton. It developed between about 1902 and 1951, and includes notable examples of Colonial Revival, Tudor Revival, and Classical Revival architecture. Located in the district are the separately listed Bethune-Powell Buildings, Clinton Depot, and Johnson Building. Other notable buildings include the Sampson County Courthouse (1904, 1937-1939), Bank of Sampson (1902), Henry Vann Building (1924), William's Building (c. 1935), DuBose Building (1938), and U. S. Post Office (1936) designed by the Office of the Supervising Architect under Louis A. Simon.

It was added to the National Register of Historic Places in 2002.
