= Pigford House =

Historic house in North Carolina, United States

- U.S. National Register of Historic Places
- Location within North Carolina Location within the United States
- Location: SR 1751 S of US 701, near Clinton, North Carolina
- Coordinates: 35°2′40″N 78°19′29″W
- Area: 9.5 acres (3.8 ha)
- Built: c. 1850
- Architectural style: Greek Revival
- MPS: Sampson County MRA
- NRHP reference No.: 86000574
- Added to NRHP: March 17, 1986

Pigford House was a historic home located near Clinton, Sampson County, North Carolina. It was built about 1850, and was a one-story, single-pile, vernacular Greek Revival style frame dwelling. It was sheathed with board-and-batten siding, had a classically inspired center gable porch, and a rear two-roam ell with a later weatherboard addition. It has been demolished.

It was added to the National Register of Historic Places in 1986.
