= Royal–Crumpler–Parker House =

Historic house in North Carolina, United States

- U.S. National Register of Historic Places
- Location within North Carolina Location within the United States
- Location: 512 Sunset Ave., Clinton, North Carolina
- Coordinates: 34°59′51″N 78°19′54″W
- Area: 1 acre (0.40 ha)
- Built: c. 1918
- Built by: Royal, Hardy
- Architectural style: Bungalow/craftsman
- MPS: Sampson County MRA
- NRHP reference No.: 86000578
- Added to NRHP: March 17, 1986

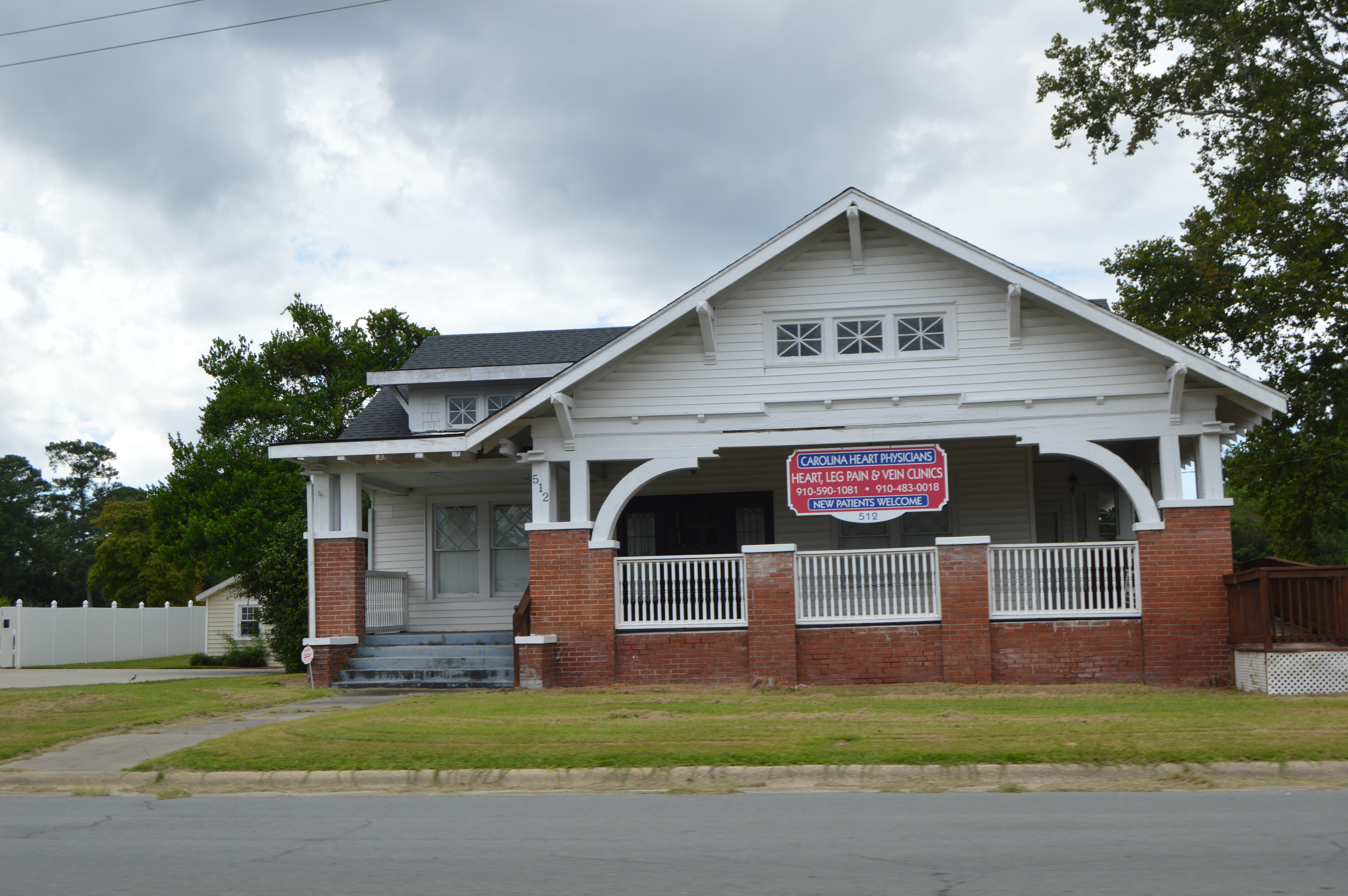
Front and southeastern side of the Royal-Crumpler-Parker House.

Royal–Crumpler–Parker House is a historic home located at Clinton, Sampson County, North Carolina. It was built around 1918, and is a one-story, rectangular, Bungalow / American Craftsman style frame dwelling. It has a wide, low, cross-gable roof; is sheathed in weatherboard; and dormers. It features a wraparound porch with an octagonal greenhouse.

It was added to the National Register of Historic Places in 1986.
