= West Main–North Chesnutt Streets Historic District =

Historic district in North Carolina, United States

- U.S. National Register of Historic Places
- U.S. Historic district
- Location within North Carolina Location within the United States
- Location: Roughly N. Chesnutt, Fayetteville, and Williams Sts. between W. Main and Margaret Sts., Clinton, North Carolina
- Coordinates: 34°59′51″N 78°19′42″W
- Area: 32 acres (13 ha)
- Built by: Multiple
- Architectural style: Greek Revival, Mixed (more Than 2 Styles From Different Periods)
- MPS: Sampson County MRA
- NRHP reference No.: 86000546
- Added to NRHP: March 17, 1986

West Main–North Chesnutt Streets Historic District is a national historic district located at Clinton, Sampson County, North Carolina. The district encompasses 44 contributing buildings in a predominantly residential section of Clinton. It developed between about 1830 to the early 1930s, and includes notable examples of Greek Revival, Colonial Revival, and Gothic Revival architecture. Notable buildings include the Richard Clinton Holmes House (pre 1826), Amma. F. Johnson House (1868), Dr. William G. Micks House (1851), William Hubbard House (c. 1865), R. H. Hubbard, Sr. House (c. 1870), St. Paul's Episcopal Church (1902), L. C. Graves Presbyterian Church (1908), C. B. Barrus House (1923), the Hathcock-Hobbs House (c. 1925), the Gabe Barbrey House (1932), and the F. L. Turlington House (1937).

It was added to the National Register of Historic Places in 1986.
