= Autryville, North Carolina =

Autryville
- Town
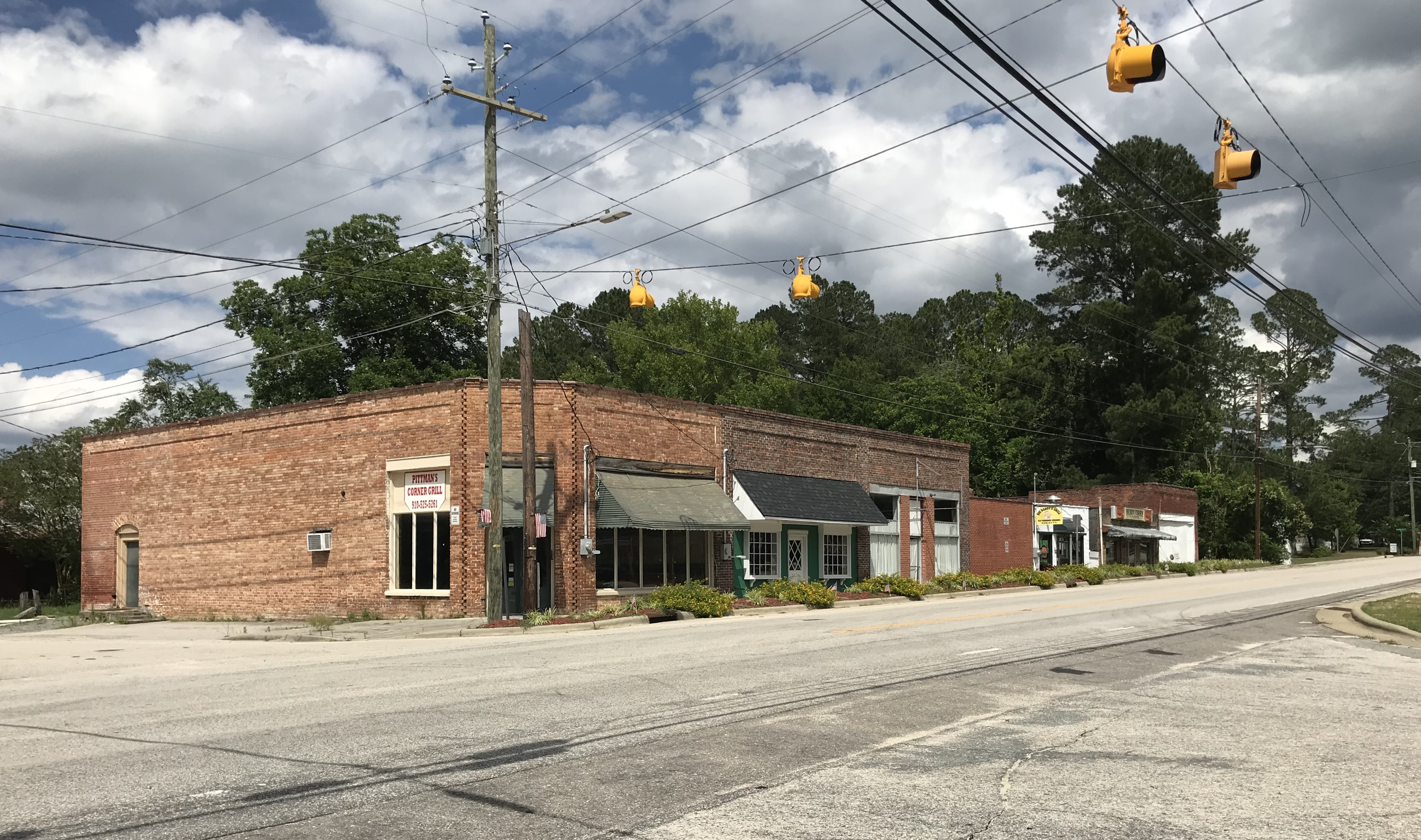
- Downtown Autryville

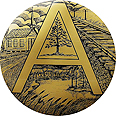
- Seal

- Location within the state of North Carolina
- Coordinates: 34°59′47″N 78°38′28″W
- Country: United States
- State: North Carolina
- County: Sampson
- Incorporated: 1891

Government
  - Mayor: Grayson Spell
  - Town Clerk: Lisa Jones

Area
  - Total: 0.52 sq mi (1.35 km^{2})
  - Land: 0.52 sq mi (1.35 km^{2})
  - Water: 0 sq mi (0.00 km^{2})
- Elevation: 112 ft (34 m)

Population (2020)
  - Total: 167
  - Density: 319.6/sq mi (123.41/km^{2})
- Time zone: UTC-5 (Eastern (EST))
  - Summer (DST): UTC-4 (EDT)
- ZIP code: 28318
- Area codes: 910, 472
- FIPS code: 37-02700
- GNIS feature ID: 2405188
- Website: https://townofautryville.com/

Autryville is a town in Sampson County, North Carolina, United States. The population was 167 at the 2020 census. The town is located in western Sampson County along the banks of the South River, adjacent to Cumberland County. Autryville is governed by a mayor and a five-member town commission. The town is about 15 miles east-southeast of Fayetteville, along North Carolina Highway 24.

== History ==
The community was settled around 1888. In April 1889, President Gray of the Cape Fear and Yadkin Valley Railway designated Autrys as a depot. In 1891, Autryville was incorporated, taking its name from local store owner James L. Autry.

The Thomas Bullard House was added to the National Register of Historic Places in 2014.

== Geography ==
According to the United States Census Bureau, the town has a total area of 0.5 square miles (1.3 km^{2}), all land.

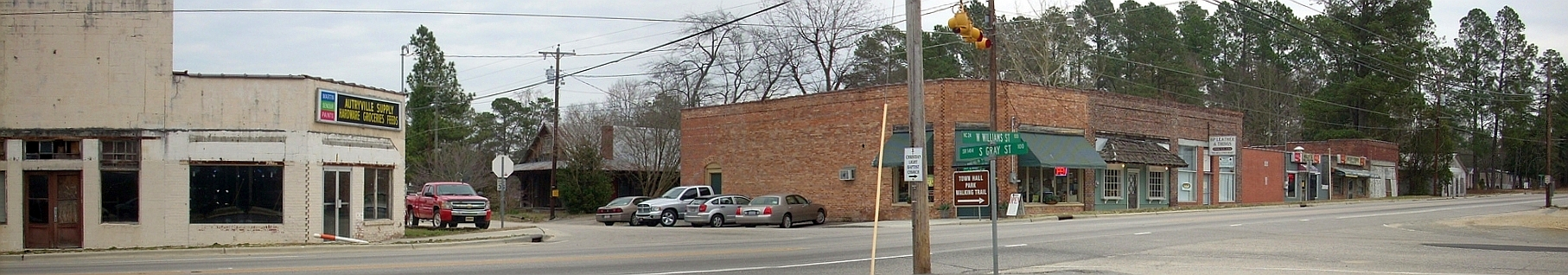
View from the post office

== Demographics ==
Historical population
| Census | Pop. | Note | %± |
|---|---|---|---|
| 1900 | 61 | | — |
| 1910 | 77 | | 26.2% |
| 1920 | 99 | | 28.6% |
| 1930 | 119 | | 20.2% |
| 1940 | 94 | | −21.0% |
| 1950 | 151 | | 60.6% |
| 1960 | 192 | | 27.2% |
| 1970 | 213 | | 10.9% |
| 1980 | 228 | | 7.0% |
| 1990 | 166 | | −27.2% |
| 2000 | 196 | | 18.1% |
| 2010 | 196 | | 0.0% |
| 2020 | 167 | | −14.8% |
U.S. Decennial Census

As of the census of 2010, there were 196 people and 118 households in Autryville. The racial makeup of the town was 87.2% White, 4.1% African American, 2% Native American, and 5.6% from two or more races. Hispanic or Latino of any race were 1% of the population.

According to the 2000 Census, there were 97 households, out of which 20.6% had children under the age of 18 living with them, 42.3% were married couples living together, 11.3% had a female householder with no husband present, and 43.3% were non-families. 40.2% of all households were made up of individuals, and 15.5% had someone living alone who was 65 years of age or older. The average household size was 2.02 and the average family size was 2.62.

In the town, the population was spread out, with 18.9% under the age of 18, 7.1% from 18 to 24, 30.1% from 25 to 44, 20.9% from 45 to 64, and 23.0% who were 65 years of age or older. The median age was 39 years. For every 100 females, there were 92.2 males. For every 100 females age 18 and over, there were 93.9 males.

The median income for a household in the town was $21,719, and the median income for a family was $28,333. Males had a median income of $27,917 versus $22,500 for females. The per capita income for the town was $22,132. About 8.6% of families and 11.7% of the population were below the poverty line, including none of those under the age of eighteen and 23.2% of those 65 or over.

== Town services ==
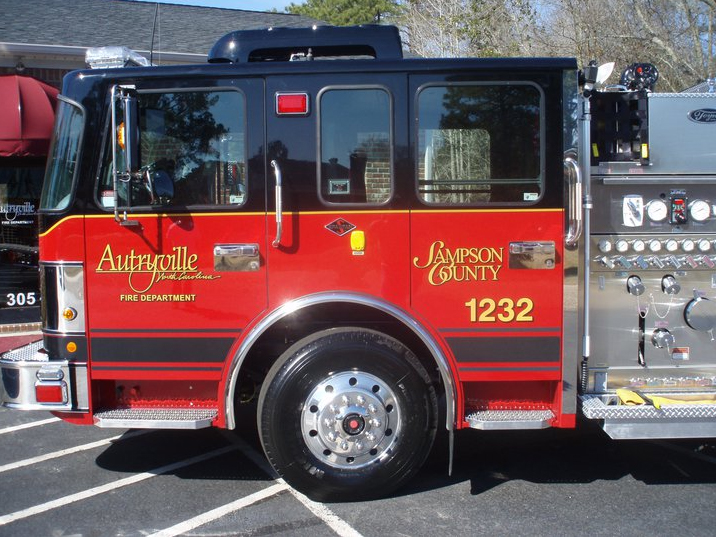
Autryville Fire Department provides service for a 6-mile radius and runs mutual aid with other departments in Sampson and Cumberland Counties

The Autryville Fire Department was chartered in 1974. It is an all volunteer department with a roster of 25 members and a board of directors. The department serves the Town of Autryville in western Sampson County and a 6-mile fire district and runs mutual aid with other departments in Sampson and Cumberland Counties. The Autryville Fire District has Fire rating of 6 in the town and an 8 in the 6-mile district. The first pumper was a 1956 Chevrolet truck with a 500-gallon per minute pump and 500 gallons of water. Today the department runs two fire engines that both carry 1000 gallons of water each with a 1500-gallon per minute pump on them, a tanker truck that carries 1300 gallons of water, and a brush truck that is used for field and brush fires in the Autryville fire district and surrounding districts in Sampson and Cumberland Counties.

== Works cited ==
- Powell, William S. (1976). The North Carolina Gazetteer: A Dictionary of Tar Heel Places. Chapel Hill: The University of North Carolina Press. ISBN 9780807812471.
