= Marcheston Killett Farm =

Historic farm in North Carolina, United States

- U.S. National Register of Historic Places
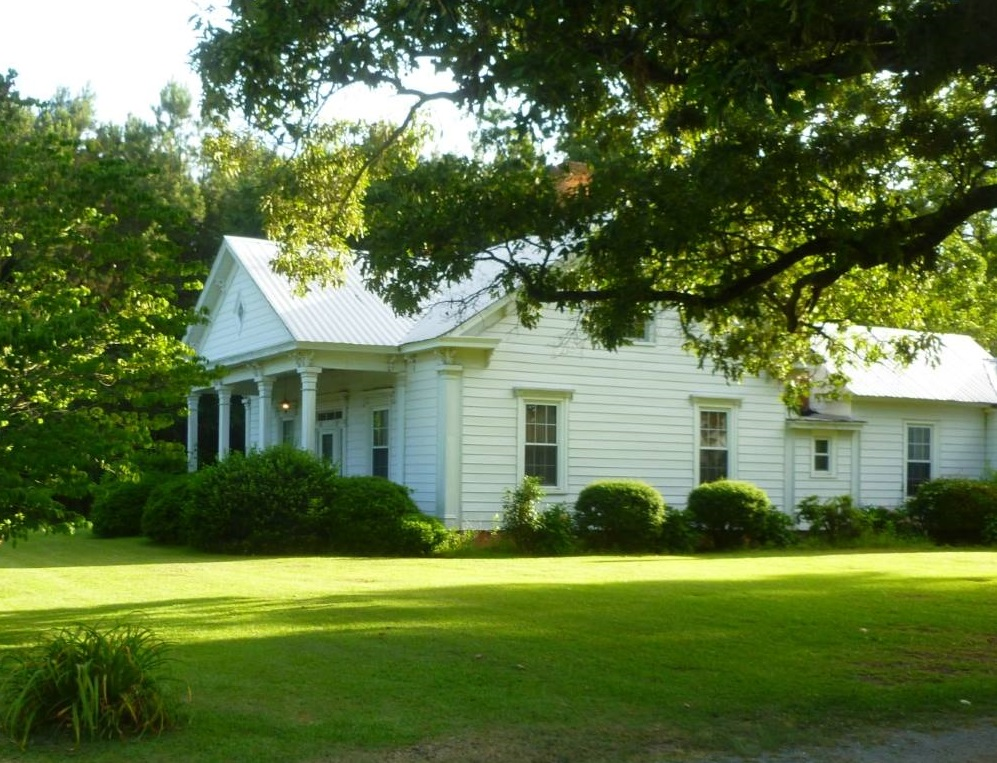
- Image of the Marcheston Killet farmhouse as seen in June 2015.

- Location within North Carolina Location within the United States
- Nearest city: SR 1222 N of US 701, near Clinton, North Carolina
- Coordinates: 34°56′31″N 78°20′21″W
- Area: 38.4 acres (15.5 ha)
- Built: c. 1865
- Architectural style: Greek Revival
- MPS: Sampson County MRA
- NRHP reference No.: 86000564
- Added to NRHP: March 17, 1986

Marcheston Killett Farm is a historic home and farm near Clinton, Sampson County, North Carolina. The house was built about 1865 and is a large one-story, double-pile, Greek Revival style frame dwelling sheathed in weatherboard. It has a cross-gable roof, a rear ell with a formerly separate log kitchen incorporated, and a dominant front, pedimented, central porch. The interior is center-hall in plan. Also on the property are the contributing sites of demolished outbuildings.

It was added to the National Register of Historic Places in 1986.
