= Gen. Thomas Boykin House =

Historic house in North Carolina, United States

- U.S. National Register of Historic Places
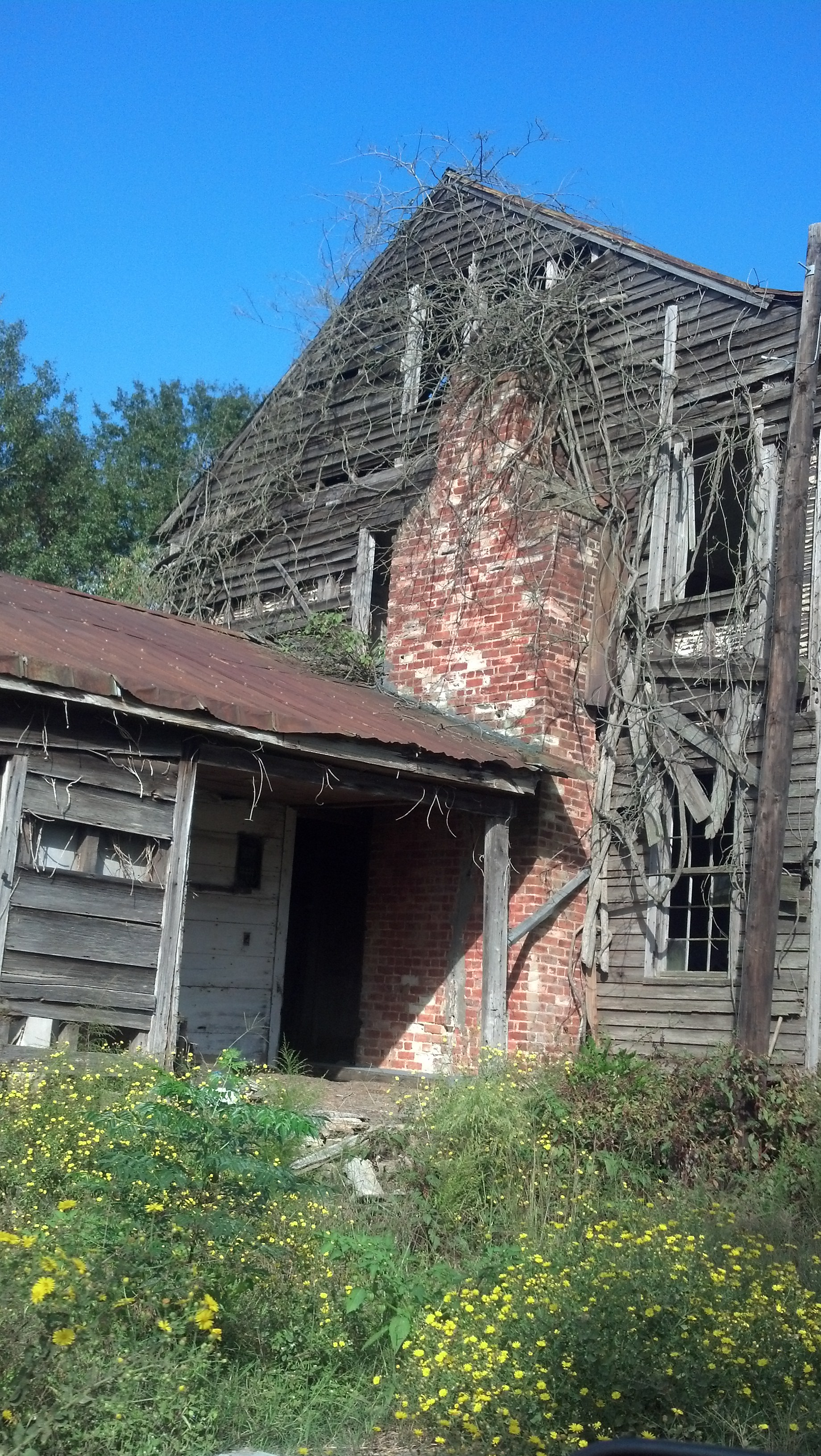
- Gen. Thomas Boykin House, September 2013

- Location within North Carolina Location within the United States
- Location: SR 1214 SW of SR 1222, near Clinton, North Carolina
- Coordinates: 34°57′43″N 78°22′26″W
- Area: 249 acres (101 ha)
- Built: c. 1810
- Architectural style: Federal, Vernacular Federal
- MPS: Sampson County MRA
- NRHP reference No.: 86000551
- Added to NRHP: March 17, 1986

Gen. Thomas Boykin House is a historic home located near Clinton, Sampson County, North Carolina. It was built about 1810, and is a large two-story, hall-and-parlor plan, vernacular Federal style frame dwelling. It has a side gable roof, is sheathed in weatherboard, and has a later one-story, two-roam wing. It was the residence of General Thomas Boykin (1785-1859), Captain in War of 1812, later a General in the Militia and a three term member of the North Carolina General Assembly.

It was added to the National Register of Historic Places in 1986.
