= Graves-Stewart House =

Historic house in North Carolina, United States

- U.S. National Register of Historic Places
- U.S. Historic district – Contributing property
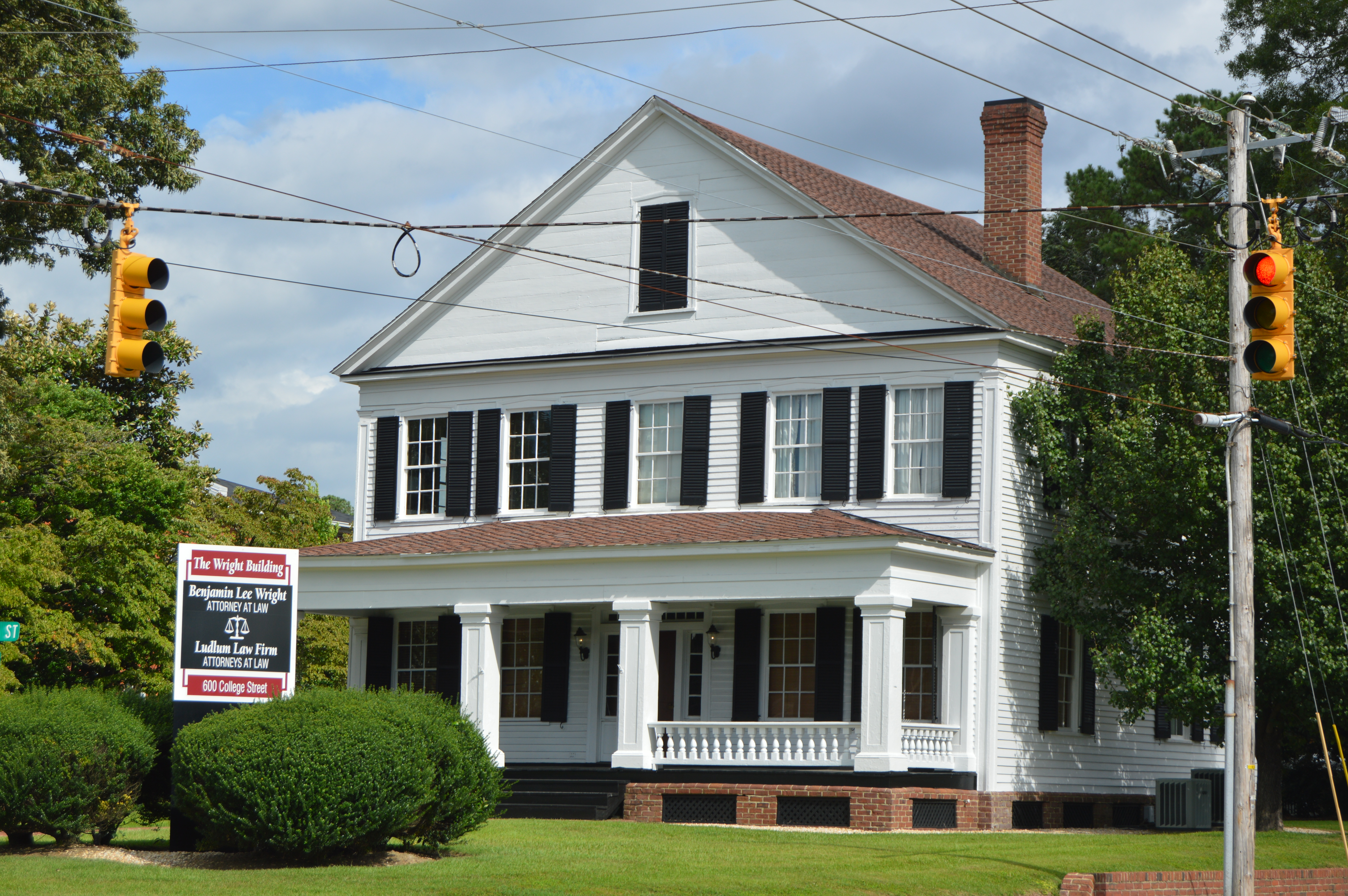
- Front

- Location within North Carolina Location within the United States
- Location: 600 College St., Clinton, North Carolina
- Coordinates: 34°59′33″N 78°19′11″W
- Area: 0.7 acres (0.28 ha)
- Built: c. 1840
- Architectural style: Greek Revival
- NRHP reference No.: 83001913
- Added to NRHP: September 8, 1983

Graves-Stewart House is a historic home located at Clinton, North Carolina, United States. It was built about 1840, and is a two-story, five-bay, double-pile, temple form, Greek Revival style frame dwelling. The front features a three-bay, one-story hip roofed porch, supported by Doric order pillars. Also on the property is a contributing carriage house. It is the only surviving structure associated with the Clinton Female Academy. It was restored and renovated for use by the First American Federal Savings and Loan Association in 1980–1981.

It was added to the National Register of Historic Places in 1983. It is located in the College Street Historic District.
