= Asher W. Bizzell House =

Historic house in North Carolina, United States

- U.S. National Register of Historic Places
- Location within North Carolina Location within the United States
- Location: US 13 and SR 1845, Rosin, North Carolina
- Coordinates: 35°12′35″N 78°24′58″W
- Area: 2.3 acres (0.93 ha)
- Built: c. 1820
- MPS: Sampson County MRA
- NRHP reference No.: 86001125
- Added to NRHP: May 21, 1986

Asher W. Bizzell House is a historic home located at Rosin, Sampson County, North Carolina. The house was built about 1820, and is a two-room, vernacular-Coastal Carolina cottage form frame dwelling. It has front and rear engaged porches and shed rooms. It was moved to its present site about 1870. The house is adjacent to the separately listed Jonas McPhail House and Annie McPhail Store.

It was added to the National Register of Historic Places in 1986.
