= Cherrydale (Turkey, North Carolina) =

Historic house in North Carolina, United States

- Cherryvale
- U.S. National Register of Historic Places
- Location within North Carolina Location within the United States
- Location: SR 1919 at SR 1952, near Turkey, North Carolina
- Coordinates: 35°1′6″N 78°12′6″W
- Area: 2 acres (0.81 ha)
- Built: 1832
- Architectural style: Federal
- MPS: Sampson County MRA
- NRHP reference No.: 86000554
- Added to NRHP: March 17, 1986

Cherryvale is a historic home located near Turkey, Sampson County, North Carolina. It was built in 1832, and is a two-story, three-bay, vernacular Federal style frame dwelling. It has a gable roof, hip roofed front porch, and exterior end chimney. It has a hall-and-parlor plan interior.

It was added to the National Register of Historic Places in 1986.
