= Samuel Johnson House and Cemetery =

Historic site in Sampson County, North Carolina, US

- U.S. National Register of Historic Places
- Location within North Carolina Location within the United States
- Location: SR 1157 S of SR 1004, near Ingold, North Carolina
- Coordinates: 34°49′09″N 78°19′31″W
- Area: 245 acres (99 ha)
- Built: c. 1840
- Architectural style: Federal, Late Federal
- MPS: Sampson County MRA
- NRHP reference No.: 86000562
- Added to NRHP: March 17, 1986

Samuel Johnson House and Cemetery is a historic plantation house located near Ingold, Sampson County, North Carolina. The house was built about 1840, and is a 2 1/2-story, five bay by three bay, single pile Late Federal style frame dwelling. It has a brick pier foundation, side gable roof, and engaged front porch with a shed roof and engaged rear shed. The interior follows a hall-and-parlor plan. Also on the property is the contributing family cemetery. It is identical in form to the Murphy-Lamb House.

It was added to the National Register of Historic Places in 1986.
