= Jonas McPhail House and Annie McPhail Store =

Historic buildings in North Carolina, United States

- U.S. National Register of Historic Places
- Location within North Carolina Location within the United States
- Location: US 13 E of SR 1845, Rosin, North Carolina
- Coordinates: 35°22′20″N 78°24′58″W
- Area: 4 acres (1.6 ha)
- Architectural style: Late Victorian
- MPS: Sampson County MRA
- NRHP reference No.: 86000571
- Added to NRHP: March 17, 1986

Jonas McPhail House and Annie McPhail Store includes two historic buildings located at Rosin, Sampson County, North Carolina. The Jonas McPhail House, is a traditional, one-story, late 19th-century farmhouse, with applied Late Victorian decorative elements. The Annie McPhail Store is a two-story, frame, weatherboarded structure from the turn of the 20th century. The buildings are adjacent to the separately listed Asher W. Bizzell House.

It was added to the National Register of Historic Places in 1986.
