= College Street Historic District (Clinton, North Carolina) =

Historic district in North Carolina, United States

- U.S. National Register of Historic Places
- U.S. Historic district
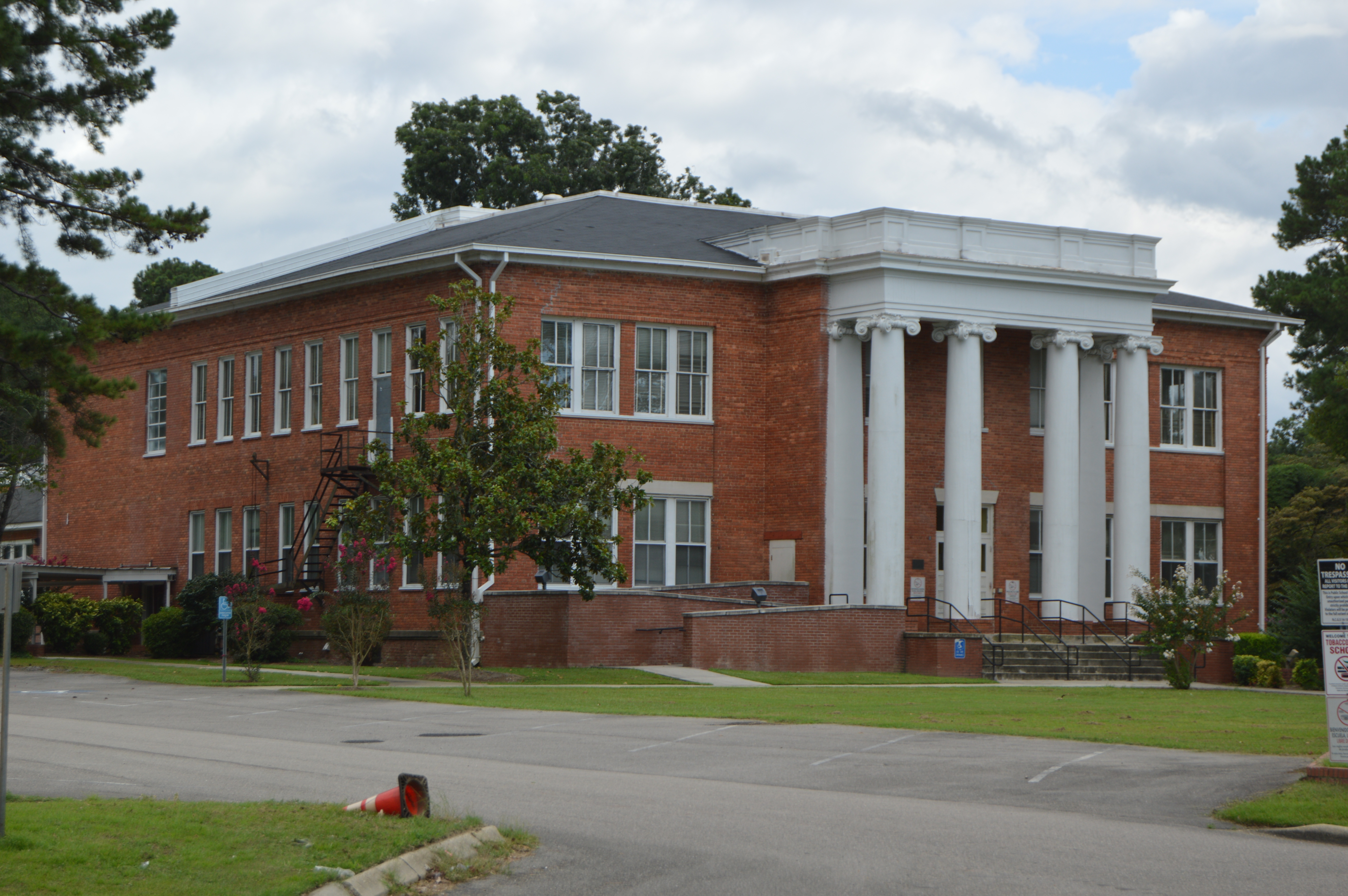
- Former College Street Elementary School

- Location within North Carolina Location within the United States
- Location: 600-802 College St., Clinton, North Carolina
- Coordinates: 34°59′54″N 78°18′49″W
- Area: 34 acres (14 ha)
- Architectural style: Colonial Revival, Classical Revival, Greek Revival
- MPS: Sampson County MRA
- NRHP reference No.: 86000553
- Added to NRHP: March 17, 1986

College Street Historic District is a national historic district located at Clinton, Sampson County, North Carolina, United States. The district encompasses 22 contributing buildings in a predominantly residential section of Clinton. It developed between about 1840 to the 1930s, and includes notable examples of Greek Revival, Colonial Revival, and Classical Revival architecture. Located in the district is the separately listed Graves-Stewart House. Other notable buildings include the Colonel John Ashford House (c. 1839, 1869), College Street Elementary School (1911), John R. Beaman House (1850s), Hobbs-Matthews-Small House (remodeled 1926), Dr. Fleet Rose Cooper House (1890s), Jim McArthur House (1905–1910), Kate Powell House (c. 1900), Henry L. Stewart House (1926), Dr. R. A. Turlington House (c. 1928), Carroll-Morris House (c. 1920), and Turlington Rental House (1929).

It was added to the National Register of Historic Places in 1986.
