= Clinton station (North Carolina) =

Historic train station in North Carolina, US

- Clinton Depot
- U.S. National Register of Historic Places
- U.S. Historic district – Contributing property
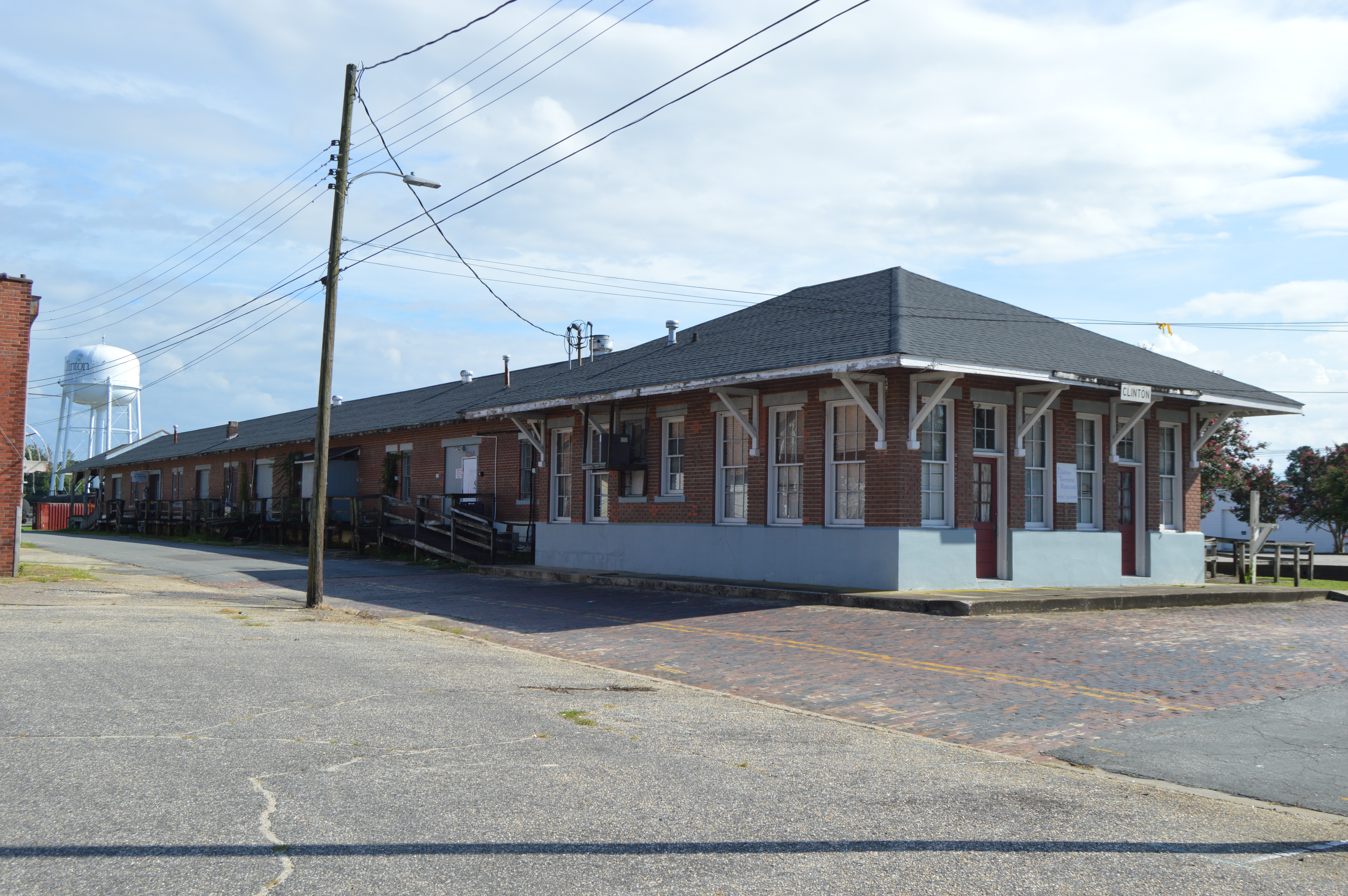
- Front and northeastern side

- Location within North Carolina Location within the United States
- Location: W. Elizabeth St., Clinton, North Carolina
- Coordinates: 34°59′38″N 78°19′24″W
- Area: 0.8 acres (0.32 ha)
- Built: 1915-1926
- MPS: Sampson County MRA
- NRHP reference No.: 86000555
- Added to NRHP: March 17, 1986

Clinton Depot is a historic train station located at Clinton, Sampson County, North Carolina. It was built between 1915 and 1926, and consists of the passenger depot, the enclosed freight station, and the open platform. The building measures 327 feet long, with the passenger section measuring 42 feet. It is a one-story, brick building with a hipped roof and wide eaves supported by large brackets.

It was added to the National Register of Historic Places in 1986. It is located in the Clinton Commercial Historic District.

Preceding station	Atlantic Coast Line Railroad	Following station
Terminus	Clinton – Warsaw	Elliott toward Warsaw
