= Patrick-Carr-Herring House =

Historic house in North Carolina, United States

- U.S. National Register of Historic Places
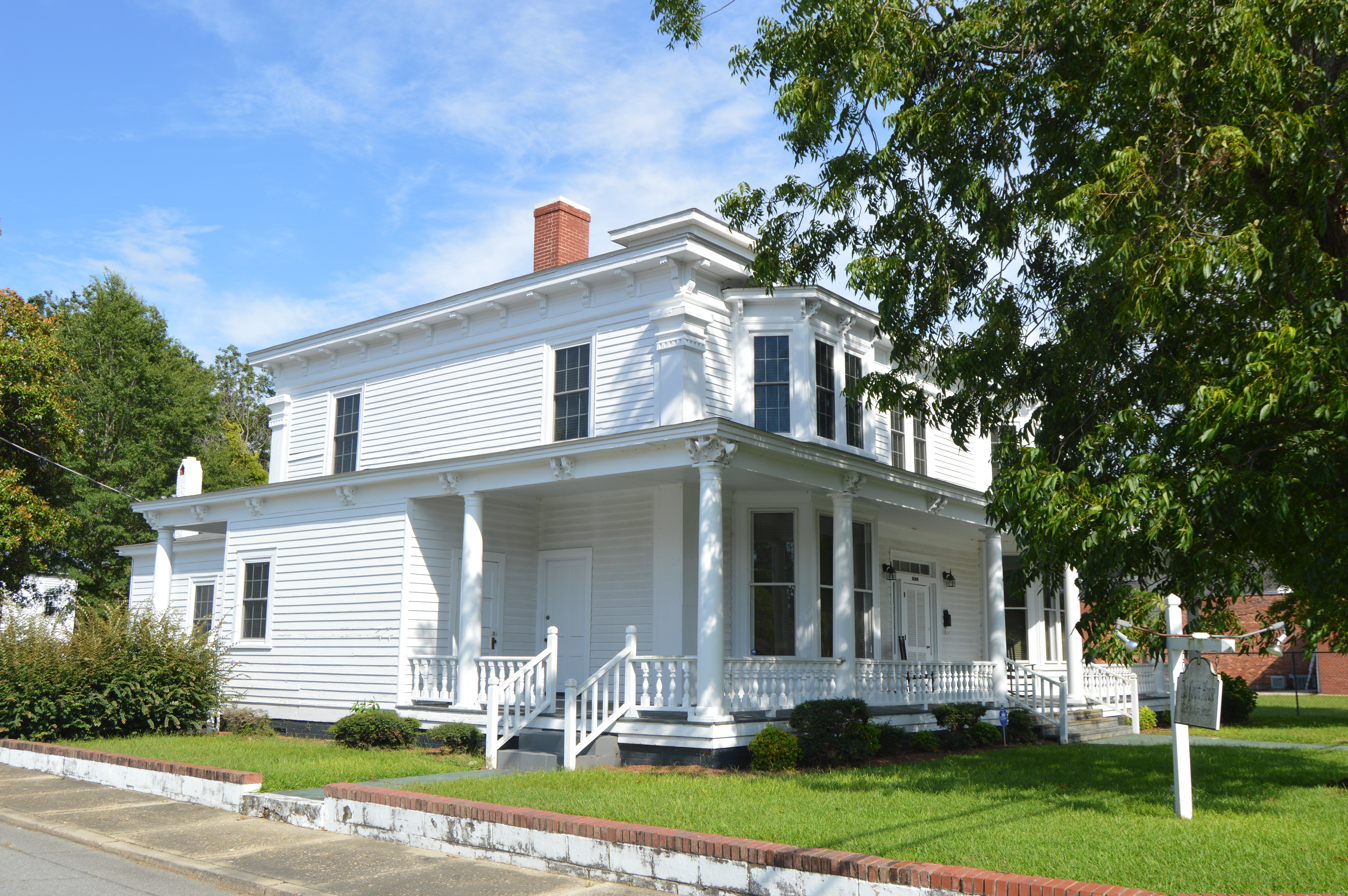
- Northwestern side and front

- Location within North Carolina Location within the United States
- Location: 226 McKoy St., Clinton, North Carolina
- Coordinates: 35°0′2″N 78°19′41″W
- Area: less than one acre
- Built: c. 1904-1905
- Built by: Patrick, Duncan
- Architectural style: Classical Revival
- NRHP reference No.: 92001791
- Added to NRHP: January 14, 1993

Patrick-Carr-Herring House, also known as the Second Sampson County Courthouse, is a historic home located at Clinton, Sampson County, North Carolina. It was built about 1904–1905, and is a two-story, three-bay, double pile, Classical Revival / Greek Revival style frame dwelling with a low-pitched hip roof. It was originally built as a 1 1/2-story structure on tall brick piers in 1818, and enlarged to a full two stories in the Greek Revival style on a full one-story brick basement in the 1840s. It was moved to its present site, and remodeled, in 1904–1905, when the current Sampson County Courthouse was constructed. The front features a single-story wraparound porch with Tuscan order columns and bracketing. Also on the property is a contributing smokehouse (c. 1904).

It was added to the National Register of Historic Places in 1993.
