= Clinton, North Carolina =

- City
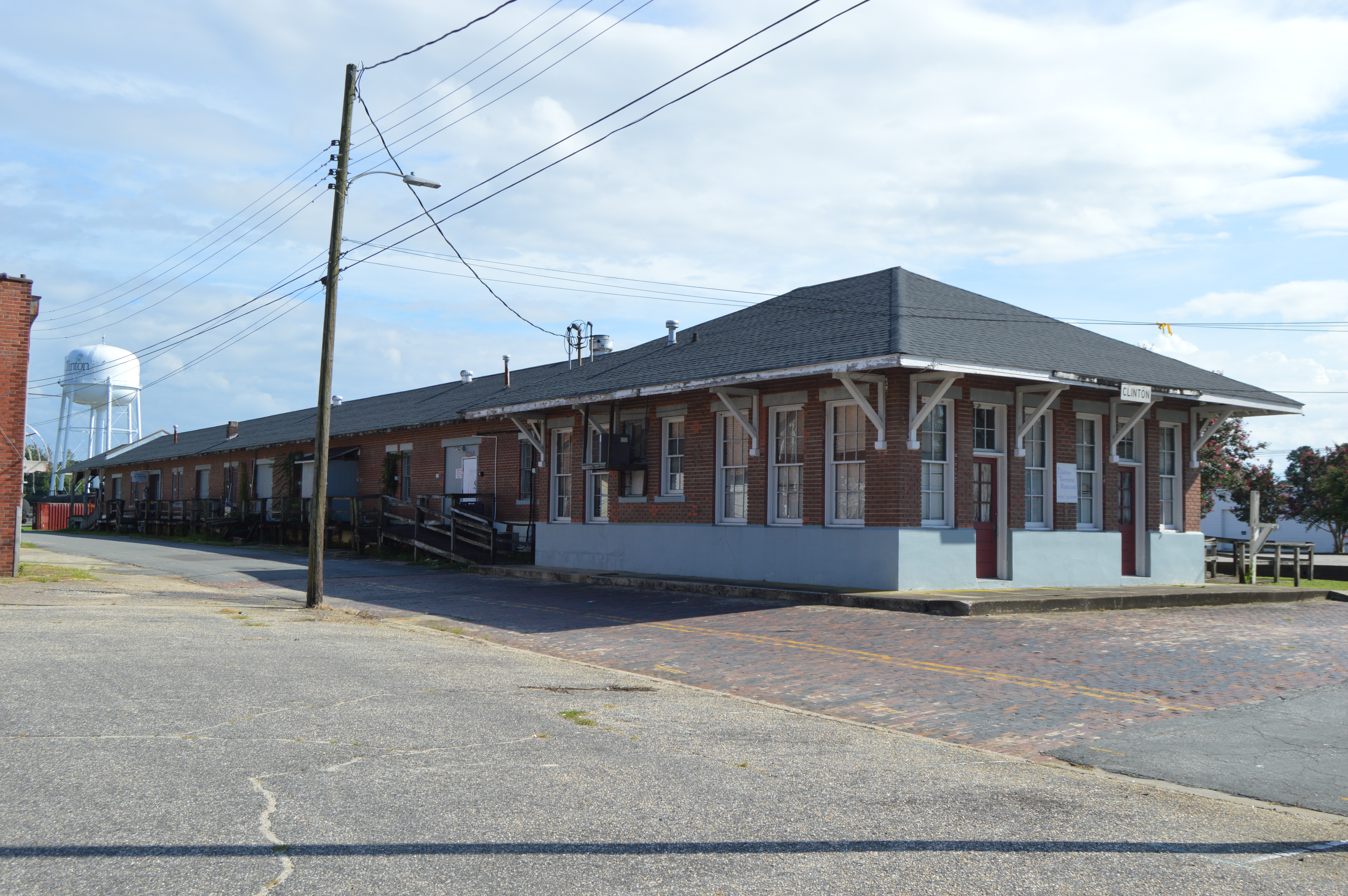
- Clinton Depot

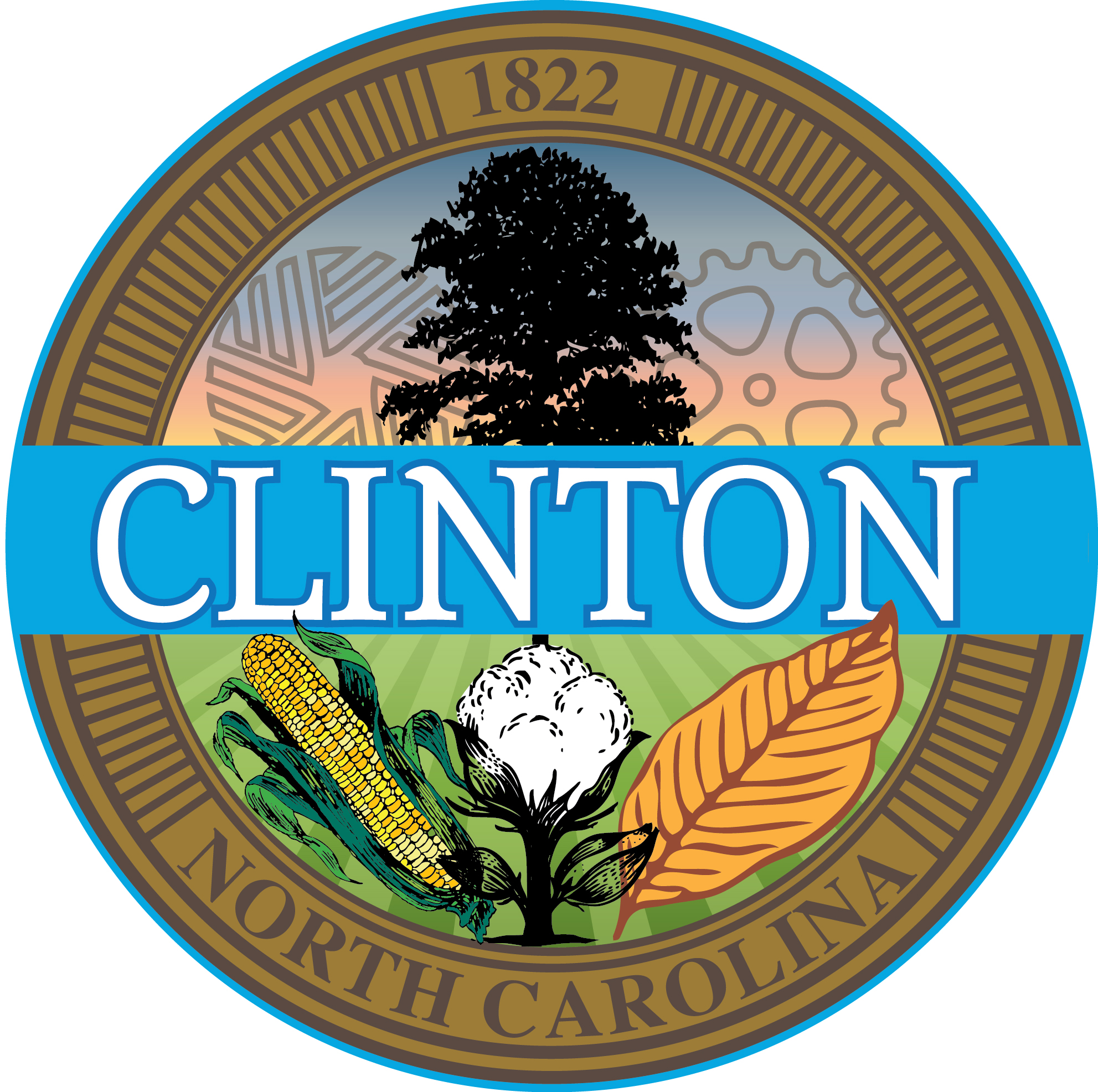
- Seal

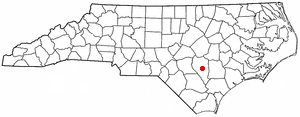
- Location of Clinton within North Carolina
- Coordinates: 35°00′02″N 78°19′53″W
- Country: United States
- State: North Carolina
- County: Sampson
- Settled: 1740
- Incorporated: 1822

Government
  - Type: Council-manager
  - Mayor: Lew Starling

Area
  - Total: 7.66 sq mi (19.85 km^{2})
  - Land: 7.63 sq mi (19.76 km^{2})
  - Water: 0.031 sq mi (0.08 km^{2})
- Elevation: 154 ft (47 m)

Population (2020)
  - Total: 8,383
  - Density: 1,098.7/sq mi (424.21/km^{2})
- Time zone: UTC−5 (EST)
  - Summer (DST): UTC−4 (EDT)
- ZIP codes: 28328-28329
- Area codes: 910, 472
- FIPS code: 37-13240
- GNIS feature ID: 2404081
- Website: cityofclintonnc.com

Clinton (locally /ˈklɪnən/ KLIN-ən, /ˈklɪntən/ KLINT-ən) is a city in and the county seat of Sampson County, North Carolina, United States. As of the 2020 census, the population was 8,383. Clinton is named for Richard Clinton, a Brigadier General of the North Carolina militia in the American Revolution.

== History ==
The first settlers came to the Clinton area around 1740. The community was originally known as Clinton Courthouse. There was an earlier incorporated town of Clinton elsewhere in the state; however, that town folded in 1822 and Clinton was incorporated as a town in the same year. In 1852, the General Assembly passed several acts to improve regulation of towns, including Clinton. As part of the "Act for the Better Regulation of the Town of Clinton in the County of Sampson," the General Assembly appointed five commissioners: James Moseley, Isaac Boykin, Dr. Henry Bizzel, John Beaman, and Alfred Johnson. The corporate limits of the town at that time extended a half mile each way from the courthouse. The first records of an election were in February 1852 and the first tax rate was $0.50 per $100 valuation of real property. In July 1953, the town became a city.

Clinton is the geographic center of the county, and because Sampson County is primarily rural farmland, Clinton developed as the major agricultural marketing center. Clinton is also where future 13th Vice President William R. King, (1786-1853), later of Alabama, under 14th President Franklin Pierce, (1804-1869), of New Hampshire, was born and began his legal career. He was inaugurated in March 1853 in Havana, Cuba, the only American executive official to be sworn in on foreign soil. He died shortly after being separately sworn in.

Clinton had a minor league baseball team in the Tobacco State League from 1946 to 1950, which was the last stop in the colorful career of Brooklyn Dodgers All-star pitcher Van Lingle Mungo.

The Bethune-Powell Buildings, Gen. Thomas Boykin House, Clinton Commercial Historic District, Clinton Depot, College Street Historic District, Graves-Stewart House, Robert Herring House, Johnson Building, Marcheston Killett Farm, Livingston Oates Farm, Patrick-Carr-Herring House, Pigford House, Pope House, Francis Pugh House, Pugh-Boykin House, Royal-Crumpler-Parker House, and West Main-North Chesnutt Streets Historic District are listed on the National Register of Historic Places.

== Geography ==
According to the United States Census Bureau, the city has a total area of 7.75 square miles (20.1 km^{2}), of which 0.04 square miles (0.10 km^{2}) (0.28%) is water.

=== Climate ===
According to the Köppen Climate Classification system, Clinton has a humid subtropical climate, abbreviated "Cfa" on climate maps. The hottest temperature recorded in Clinton was 104 °F (40.0 °C) on August 22, 1983, while the coldest temperature recorded was −2 °F (−18.9 °C) on January 21, 1985.

Climate data for Clinton, North Carolina, 1991–2020 normals, extremes 1971–present
| Month | Jan | Feb | Mar | Apr | May | Jun | Jul | Aug | Sep | Oct | Nov | Dec | Year |
|---|---|---|---|---|---|---|---|---|---|---|---|---|---|
| Record high °F (°C) | 79 (26) | 83 (28) | 89 (32) | 94 (34) | 98 (37) | 102 (39) | 102 (39) | 104 (40) | 100 (38) | 96 (36) | 85 (29) | 81 (27) | 104 (40) |
| Mean maximum °F (°C) | 72.9 (22.7) | 75.2 (24.0) | 80.8 (27.1) | 85.9 (29.9) | 91.7 (33.2) | 95.7 (35.4) | 96.9 (36.1) | 95.9 (35.5) | 91.6 (33.1) | 86.4 (30.2) | 79.0 (26.1) | 73.9 (23.3) | 98.3 (36.8) |
| Mean daily maximum °F (°C) | 53.0 (11.7) | 56.2 (13.4) | 63.5 (17.5) | 72.8 (22.7) | 80.1 (26.7) | 86.7 (30.4) | 89.4 (31.9) | 87.8 (31.0) | 82.7 (28.2) | 73.8 (23.2) | 64.0 (17.8) | 56.3 (13.5) | 72.2 (22.3) |
| Daily mean °F (°C) | 42.5 (5.8) | 45.2 (7.3) | 51.9 (11.1) | 61.0 (16.1) | 69.2 (20.7) | 76.7 (24.8) | 80.0 (26.7) | 78.2 (25.7) | 72.9 (22.7) | 62.2 (16.8) | 52.3 (11.3) | 45.8 (7.7) | 61.5 (16.4) |
| Mean daily minimum °F (°C) | 32.1 (0.1) | 34.2 (1.2) | 40.3 (4.6) | 49.2 (9.6) | 58.3 (14.6) | 66.7 (19.3) | 70.5 (21.4) | 68.7 (20.4) | 63.1 (17.3) | 50.6 (10.3) | 40.7 (4.8) | 35.3 (1.8) | 50.8 (10.5) |
| Mean minimum °F (°C) | 16.6 (−8.6) | 20.8 (−6.2) | 25.3 (−3.7) | 33.8 (1.0) | 44.0 (6.7) | 55.0 (12.8) | 62.2 (16.8) | 59.9 (15.5) | 51.4 (10.8) | 35.7 (2.1) | 25.7 (−3.5) | 21.4 (−5.9) | 15.0 (−9.4) |
| Record low °F (°C) | −2 (−19) | 3 (−16) | 8 (−13) | 26 (−3) | 35 (2) | 42 (6) | 52 (11) | 46 (8) | 40 (4) | 24 (−4) | 17 (−8) | 5 (−15) | −2 (−19) |
| Average precipitation inches (mm) | 3.50 (89) | 3.11 (79) | 3.68 (93) | 3.41 (87) | 4.05 (103) | 4.62 (117) | 5.83 (148) | 6.01 (153) | 6.56 (167) | 3.27 (83) | 3.44 (87) | 3.53 (90) | 51.01 (1,296) |
| Average snowfall inches (cm) | 0.8 (2.0) | 0.5 (1.3) | 0.0 (0.0) | 0.0 (0.0) | 0.0 (0.0) | 0.0 (0.0) | 0.0 (0.0) | 0.0 (0.0) | 0.0 (0.0) | 0.0 (0.0) | 0.0 (0.0) | 0.5 (1.3) | 1.8 (4.6) |
| Average precipitation days (≥ 0.01 in) | 10.6 | 9.8 | 10.2 | 8.9 | 9.6 | 10.9 | 11.3 | 11.3 | 9.0 | 7.8 | 8.1 | 10.6 | 118.1 |
| Average snowy days (≥ 0.1 in) | 0.4 | 0.2 | 0.0 | 0.0 | 0.0 | 0.0 | 0.0 | 0.0 | 0.0 | 0.0 | 0.0 | 0.2 | 0.8 |
Source 1: NOAA
Source 2: National Weather Service

== Demographics ==
Historical population
| Census | Pop. | Note | %± |
|---|---|---|---|
| 1860 | 209 | | — |
| 1870 | 204 | | −2.4% |
| 1880 | 620 | | 203.9% |
| 1890 | 839 | | 35.3% |
| 1900 | 958 | | 14.2% |
| 1910 | 1,101 | | 14.9% |
| 1920 | 2,110 | | 91.6% |
| 1930 | 2,712 | | 28.5% |
| 1940 | 3,557 | | 31.2% |
| 1950 | 4,414 | | 24.1% |
| 1960 | 7,461 | | 69.0% |
| 1970 | 7,157 | | −4.1% |
| 1980 | 7,552 | | 5.5% |
| 1990 | 8,204 | | 8.6% |
| 2000 | 8,600 | | 4.8% |
| 2010 | 8,639 | | 0.5% |
| 2020 | 8,383 | | −3.0% |
U.S. Decennial Census

=== 2020 census ===
As of the 2020 census, Clinton had a population of 8,383. The median age was 41.9 years. 22.0% of residents were under the age of 18 and 21.9% of residents were 65 years of age or older. For every 100 females there were 92.0 males, and for every 100 females age 18 and over there were 89.4 males age 18 and over.

99.9% of residents lived in urban areas, while 0.1% lived in rural areas.

There were 3,348 households in Clinton, of which 30.1% had children under the age of 18 living in them. Of all households, 34.2% were married-couple households, 17.4% were households with a male householder and no spouse or partner present, and 43.8% were households with a female householder and no spouse or partner present. About 37.1% of all households were made up of individuals and 20.6% had someone living alone who was 65 years of age or older. There were 1,826 families residing in the city.

There were 3,772 housing units, of which 11.2% were vacant. The homeowner vacancy rate was 1.7% and the rental vacancy rate was 8.5%.

Clinton racial composition
| Race | Number | Percentage |
|---|---|---|
| White (non-Hispanic) | 3,338 | 39.82% |
| Black or African American (non-Hispanic) | 3,343 | 39.88% |
| Native American | 101 | 1.2% |
| Asian | 96 | 1.15% |
| Pacific Islander | 6 | 0.07% |
| Other/Mixed | 297 | 3.54% |
| Hispanic or Latino | 1,202 | 14.34% |

=== 2010 census ===
As of the census of 2010, there were 8,639 people, 3,392 households, and 2,068 families residing in the city. The population density was 1,114.7 people per square mile (430.4 people/km^{2}). There were 3,711 housing units at an average density of 478.8 per square mile (184.9/km^{2}). The racial makeup of the city was 48.9% White, 40.5% African American, 1.2% Native American, 1.1% Asian, 0.03% Pacific Islander, 6.1% from other races, and 2.2% from two or more races. Hispanic or Latino of any race were 9.2% of the population.

There were 3,392 households, out of which 25.3% had children under the age of 18 living with them, 36.4% were married couples living together, 20.5% had a female householder with no husband present, and 39.0% were non-families; 36.6% of all households were made up of individuals, and 18.1% had someone living alone who was 65 years of age or older. The average household size was 2.27 and the average family size was 2.95.

The age distribution of the city was 23.6% under the age of 20, 23.8% from 20 to 39, 32.1% from 40 to 64, and 21.5% age 65 years or older. The median age was 42.1 years. For every 100 females, there were 90.4 males. For every 100 females age 18 and over, there were 86.1 males.

According to the US Census 2013 Community Survey, the median household income in the city is $32,927, and the median family income is $52,100. The per capita income for the city is $24,119. About 20.2% of families and 27.8% of the population were below the poverty line, including 43.2% of those under age 18 and 18.9% of those age 65 or over.

== Notable people ==
- Sam Aiken – former NFL wide receiver
- Rube Benton – former MLB player
- Ronnie Dixon – former NFL defensive tackle
- Lauch Faircloth – U.S. Senator (R-NC) 1993–99
- Gwendolyn Faison – former Mayor of Camden, New Jersey (2000-2010)
- Pearl Fryar – topiary artist
- Nelson Z. Graves – businessman
- Leonard Henry – former NFL running back
- Terry Holland – basketball head coach University of Virginia, athletic director East Carolina University
- William Rufus DeVane King – 13th Vice President of the United States
- Jerris McPhail – former NFL running back
- John Merrick – founded North Carolina Mutual Life Insurance Company
- Dennis Owens – former NFL nose tackle
- Willie Parker – former NFL running back, two-time Pro Bowl selection and two-time Super Bowl champion with the Pittsburgh Steelers
- Curtis Smith – World Champion and Hall of Fame Drag Racer
- Jaylen Warren - NFL running back
