= Troy Herring House =

Historic house in North Carolina, United States

- U.S. National Register of Historic Places
- Location within North Carolina Location within the United States
- Location: Broad St. S of NC 24, Roseboro, North Carolina
- Coordinates: 34°57′25″N 78°31′0″W
- Area: 3.6 acres (1.5 ha)
- Built: 1912
- Built by: Herring, D.C.
- Architectural style: Classical Revival
- MPS: Sampson County MRA
- NRHP reference No.: 86000558
- Added to NRHP: March 17, 1986

Troy Herring House is a historic home located at Roseboro, Sampson County, North Carolina. It was built in 1912, and is a two-story, three bay by five bay, Classical Revival style frame dwelling with a truncated hipped roof. The front features a two-story central portico, with paired and fluted Ionic order columns and a one-story wraparound porch with Ionic order capitals. The house is similar to one built by Troy Herring's first cousin Robert Herring of Roseboro in 1916.

It was added to the National Register of Historic Places in 1986. This home was salvaged by Giuliano Giannone who salvaged and restored it in 1997 to 1999.
