= Pugh-Boykin House =

Historic house in North Carolina, United States

- U.S. National Register of Historic Places
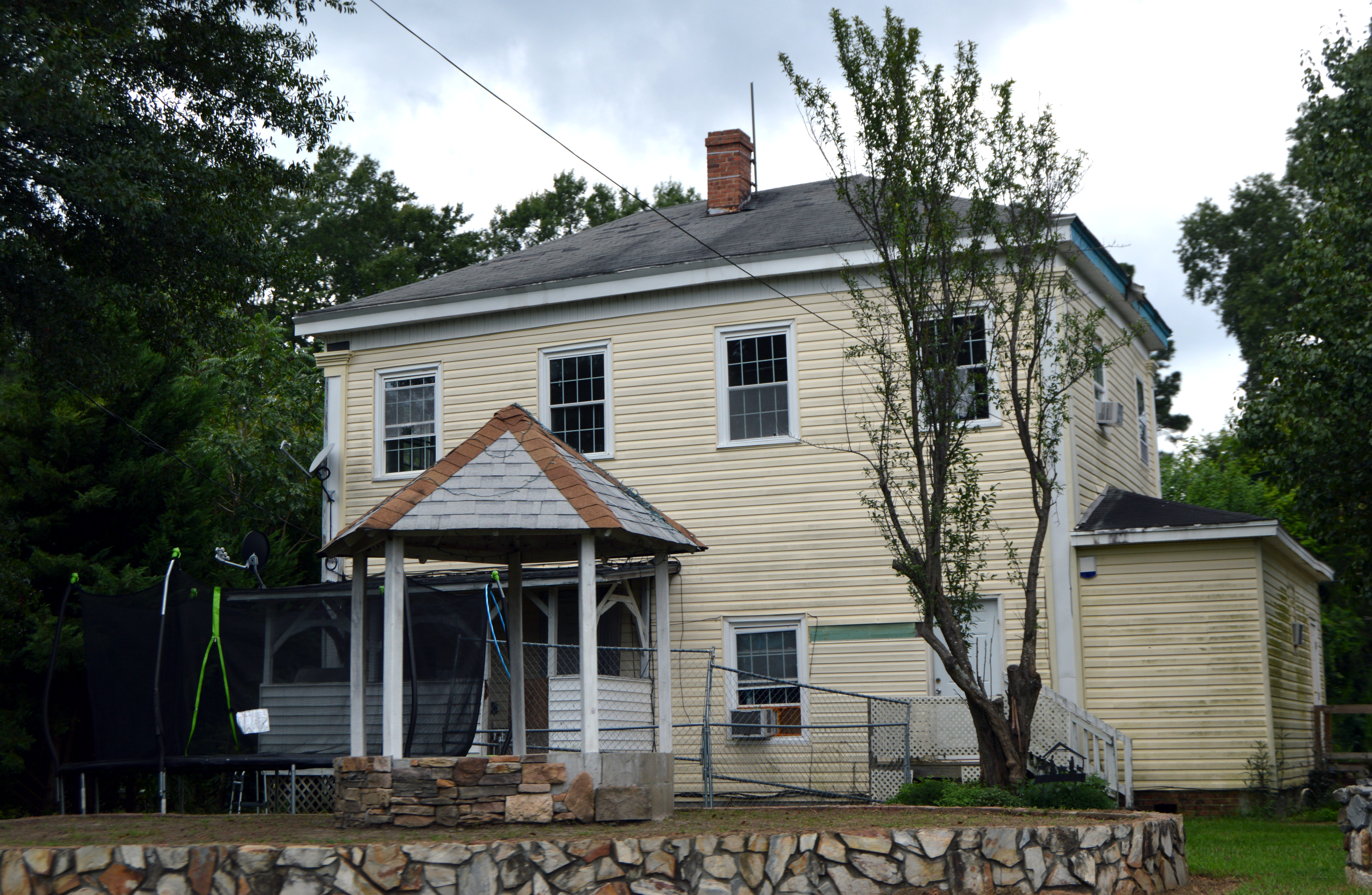
- Front

- Location within North Carolina Location within the United States
- Location: 306 Elizabeth St., Clinton, North Carolina
- Coordinates: 34°59′39″N 78°19′32″W
- Area: 0.5 acres (0.20 ha)
- Built: c. 1855
- Built by: Thomas Lee
- Architectural style: Greek Revival, Side-hall plan
- MPS: Sampson County MRA
- NRHP reference No.: 86000576
- Added to NRHP: March 17, 1986

Pugh-Boykin House is a historic home located at Clinton, Sampson County, North Carolina. It was built about 1855, and is a two-story, double-pile, side hall plan, Greek Revival style frame dwelling. It has a hipped roof, hip roof porch, and paneled corner pilasters.

It was added to the National Register of Historic Places in 1986.
