= Suttontown, North Carolina =

- Unincorporated community
- Location of Suttontown in North Carolina Suttontown (the United States)
- Coordinates: 35°12′13″N 78°14′26″W
- Country: United States
- State: North Carolina
- County: Sampson
- Elevation: 171 ft (52 m)
- Time zone: UTC-5 (Eastern (EST))
  - Summer (DST): UTC-4 (EDT)
- ZIP code: 28341
- Area codes: 910, 472
- GNIS feature ID: 995733

Suttontown is an unincorporated community in Sampson County, North Carolina, United States.

The Marshall Kornegay House and Cemetery was added to the National Register of Historic Places in 1986.
