= Robert Herring House =

Historic house in North Carolina, United States

- U.S. National Register of Historic Places
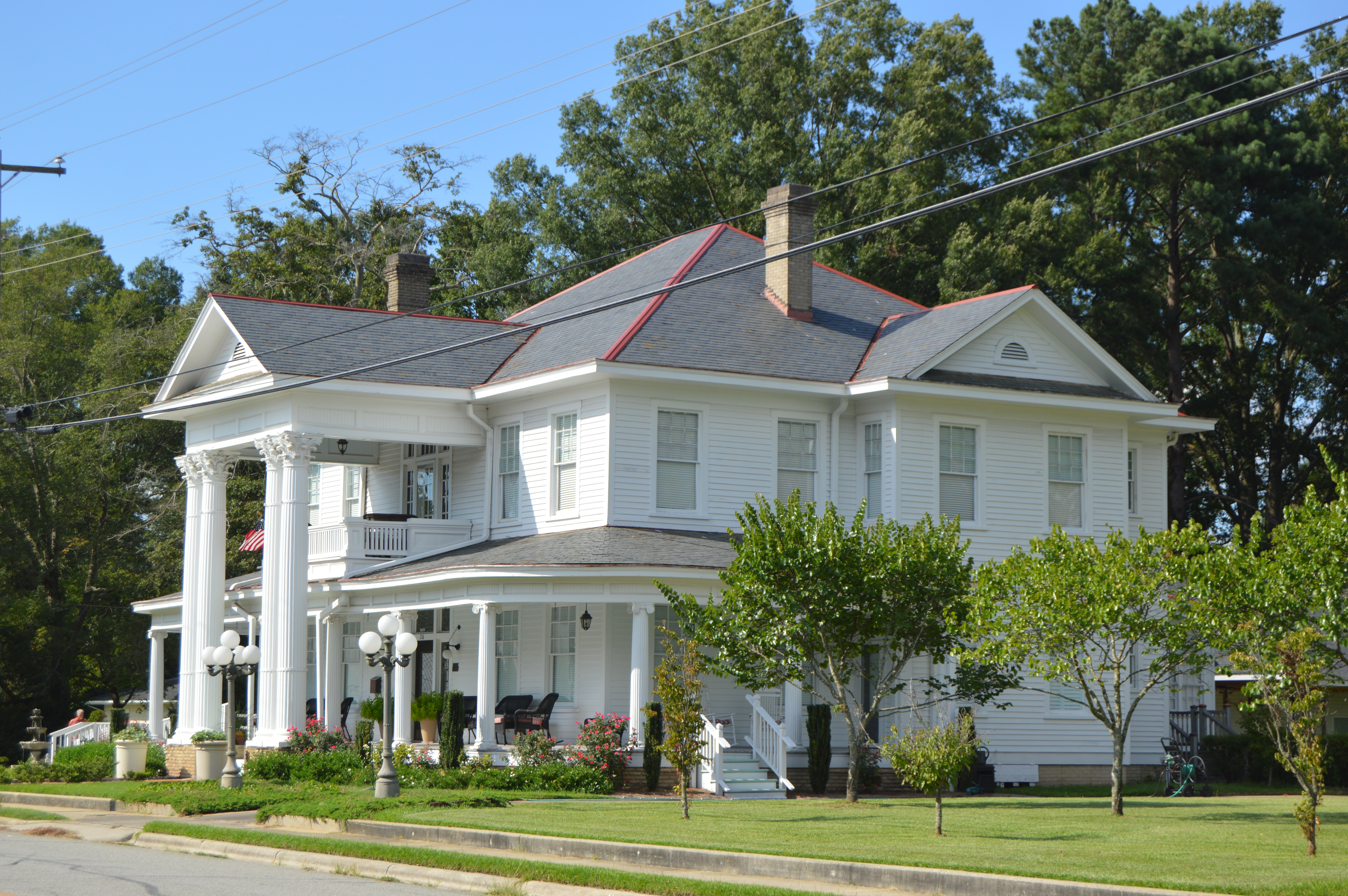
- Front and southeastern side

- Location within North Carolina Location within the United States
- Location: 216 Sampson St., Clinton, North Carolina
- Coordinates: 35°0′3″N 78°19′29″W
- Area: 1.3 acres (0.53 ha)
- Built: 1916
- Architectural style: Classical Revival
- MPS: Sampson County MRA
- NRHP reference No.: 86000557
- Added to NRHP: March 17, 1986

Robert Herring House is a historic home located at Clinton, Sampson County, North Carolina. It was built in 1916, and is a two-story, five-bay by five-bay, Classical Revival style frame dwelling with a slate hipped roof. The front features a two-story central portico, with paired and fluted Corinthian order columns and a one-story wraparound porch with Ionic order capitals. The house is similar to one built by Robert Herring's first cousin Troy Herring of Roseboro in 1912.

It was added to the National Register of Historic Places in 1986.
