= Francis Pugh House =

Historic house in North Carolina, United States

- U.S. National Register of Historic Places
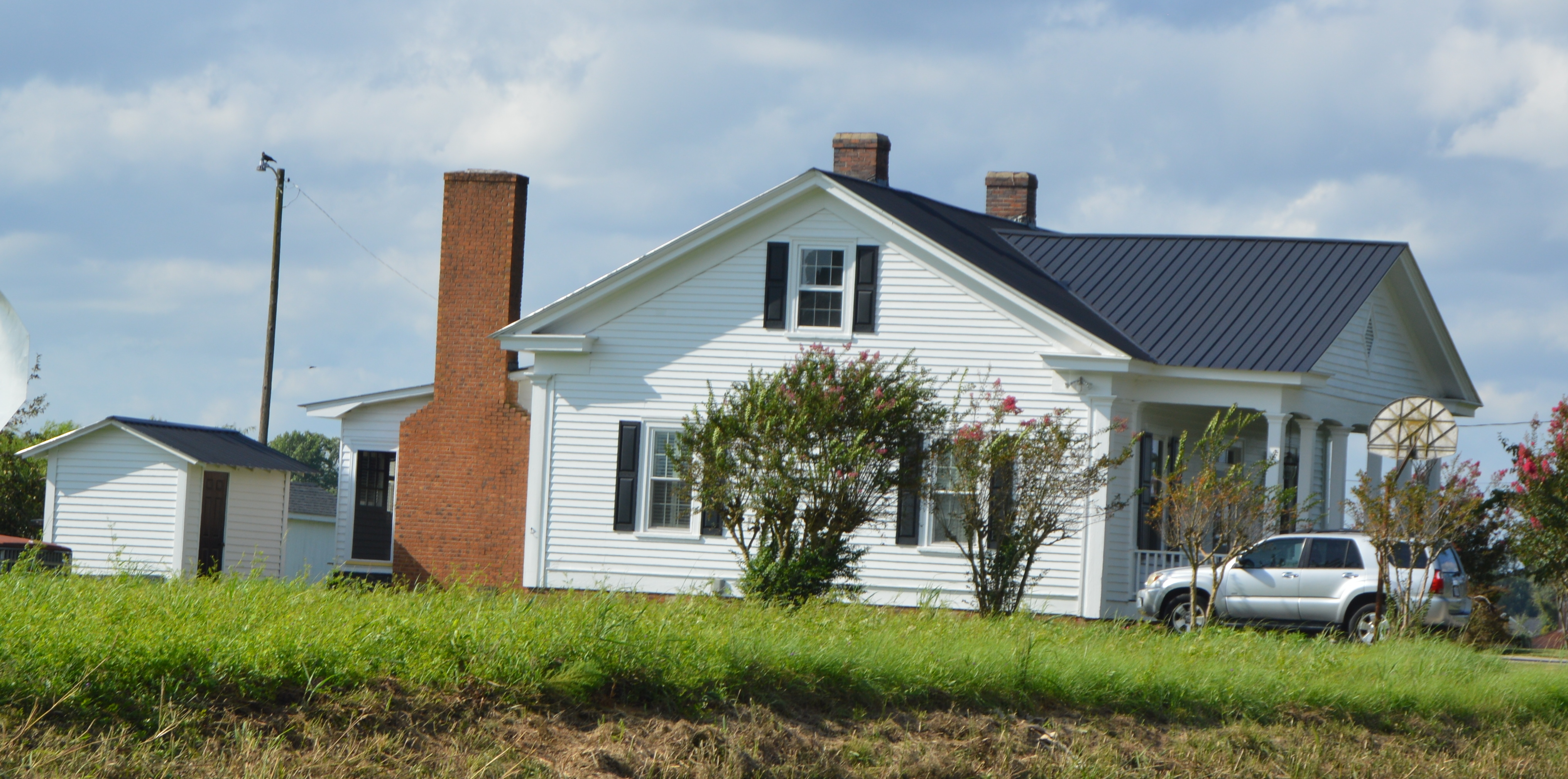
- Distant view from the south

- Location within North Carolina Location within the United States
- Location: SR 1751 at NC 403, near Clinton, North Carolina
- Coordinates: 35°00′34″N 78°18′08″W
- Area: less than one acre
- Built: c. 1850
- Architectural style: Greek Revival
- MPS: Sampson County MRA
- NRHP reference No.: 86000577
- Added to NRHP: March 17, 1986

Francis Pugh House is a historic home located near Clinton, Sampson County, North Carolina. It was built about 1850, and is a one-story, double-pile center hall plan, Greek Revival style frame dwelling. It has a cross gable roof, brick pier foundation, and is sheathed in weatherboard. The front facade features a large, three bay gable front porch, supported by six Doric order pillars and two pilasters. It was restored in 1972 for an antique store.

It was added to the National Register of Historic Places in 1986.
