= Garland, North Carolina =

- Town
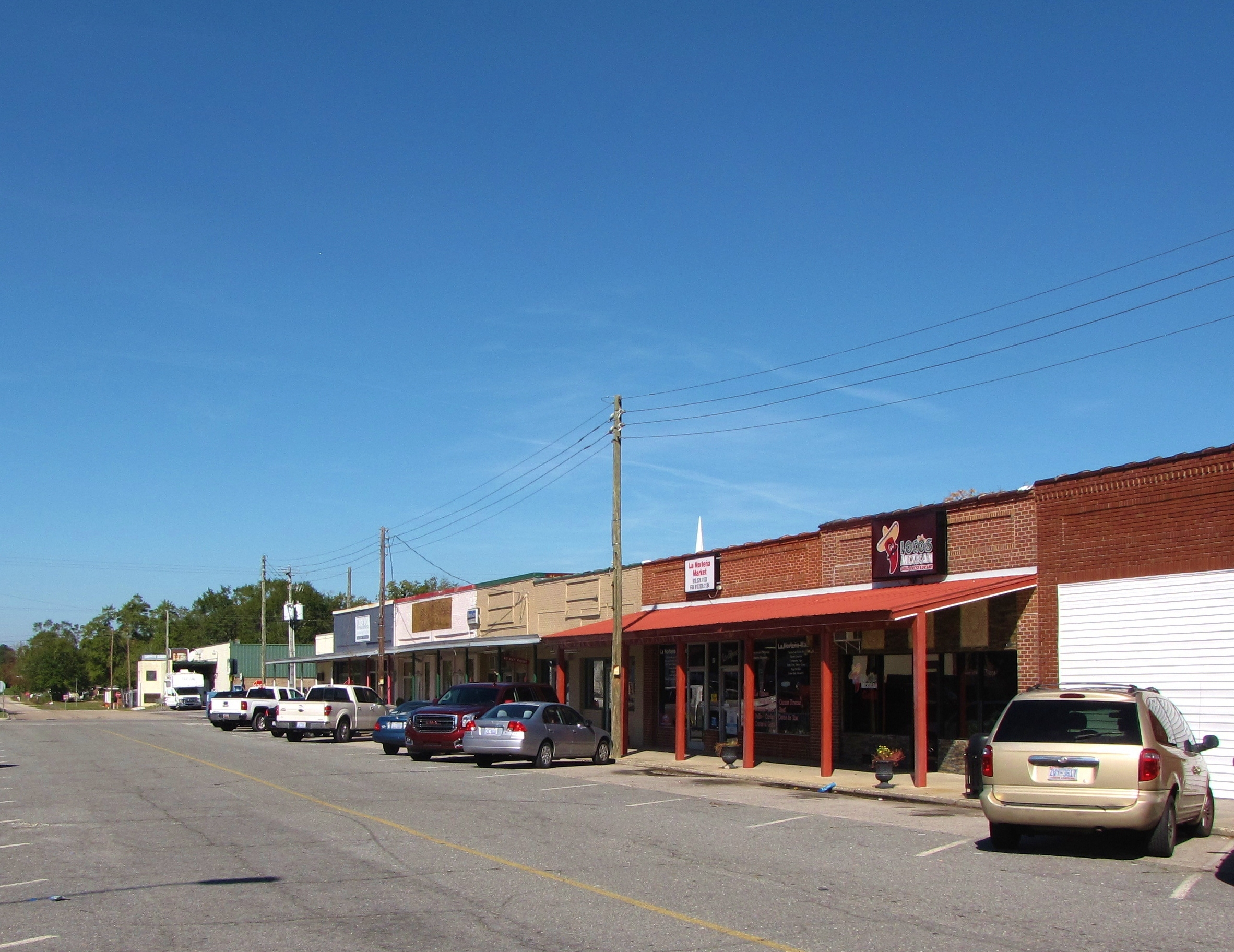
- Front Street in Garland

- Location within the state of North Carolina
- Coordinates: 34°47′09″N 78°23′41″W
- Country: United States
- State: North Carolina
- County: Sampson

Area
  - Total: 1.08 sq mi (2.80 km^{2})
  - Land: 1.08 sq mi (2.79 km^{2})
  - Water: 0.0077 sq mi (0.02 km^{2})
- Elevation: 135 ft (41 m)

Population (2020)
  - Total: 595
  - Density: 552.9/sq mi (213.48/km^{2})
- Time zone: UTC-5 (Eastern (EST))
  - Summer (DST): UTC-4 (EDT)
- ZIP code: 28441
- Area codes: 910, 472
- FIPS code: 37-25460
- GNIS feature ID: 2406545
- Website: https://www.townofgarlandnc.com/

Garland is a town in Sampson County, North Carolina, United States. The population was 595 at the 2020 census.

== History ==
The community was settled in about 1888 and named Sloan's Crossing. It was incorporated in 1907 as Garland, after U.S. Attorney General Augustus Hill Garland.

== Geography ==
According to the United States Census Bureau, the town has a total area of 1.1 square miles (2.8 km^{2}), of which 1.1 square miles (2.8 km^{2}) is land and 0.93% is water.

== Demographics ==
Historical population
Census	Pop.	Note	%±
1920	301		—
1930	509		69.1%
1940	484		−4.9%
1950	539		11.4%
1960	642		19.1%
1970	656		2.2%
1980	885		34.9%
1990	746		−15.7%
2000	808		8.3%
2010	625		−22.6%
2020	595		−4.8%
U.S. Decennial Census

=== 2020 census ===
Garland racial composition
Race	Number	Percentage
White (non-Hispanic)	225	37.82%
Black or African American (non-Hispanic)	162	27.23%
Native American	6	1.01%
Asian	2	0.34%
Other/Mixed	20	3.36%
Hispanic or Latino	180	30.25%

As of the 2020 United States census, there were 595 people, 290 households, and 185 families residing in the town.

=== 2000 census ===
As of the census of 2000, there were 808 people, 276 households, and 203 families residing in the town. The population density was 751.2 inhabitants per square mile (290.0/km^{2}). There were 313 housing units at an average density of 291.0 per square mile (112.4/km^{2}). The racial makeup of the town was 48.64% White, 33.79% African American, 0.62% Native American, 15.59% from other races, and 1.36% from two or more races. Hispanic or Latino of any race were 18.56% of the population.

There were 276 households, out of which 32.6% had children under the age of 18 living with them, 46.4% were married couples living together, 23.2% had a female householder with no husband present, and 26.4% were non-families. 22.8% of all households were made up of individuals, and 12.0% had someone living alone who was 65 years of age or older. The average household size was 2.78 and the average family size was 3.20.

In the town, the population was spread out, with 25.1% under the age of 18, 10.9% from 18 to 24, 25.7% from 25 to 44, 22.2% from 45 to 64, and 16.1% who were 65 years of age or older. The median age was 34 years. For every 100 females, there were 91.9 males. For every 100 females age 18 and over, there were 90.3 males.

The median income for a household in the town was $29,000, and the median income for a family was $29,145. Males had a median income of $20,288 versus $17,417 for females. The per capita income for the town was $13,533. About 24.4% of families and 25.7% of the population were below the poverty line, including 36.6% of those under age 18 and 24.4% of those age 65 or over.

== Notable interests ==
- Austin Brown was elected as the youngest commissioner in the town's history in November 2017 at the age of 22. He was later elected as the towns youngest Mayor Pro Tempore. In 2021 Brown was elected Mayor of the Town and served a 2-year term that ended in 2023.
- The South River Presbyterian Church was added to the National Register of Historic Places in 1996.

== Works cited ==
- Powell, William S. (1976). The North Carolina Gazetteer: A Dictionary of Tar Heel Places. Chapel Hill: The University of North Carolina Press. ISBN 9780807812471.
