= North Carolina's 3rd congressional district =

U.S. House district for North Carolina

Coordinates: 35.28°N 76.83°W

- Interactive map of district boundaries
- Representative: Greg Murphy; R–Greenville
- Population (2025): 783,415
- Median household income: $70,702
- Ethnicity: 62.2% White; 20.2% Black; 10.6% Hispanic; 4.4% Two or more races; 1.6% Asian; 1.0% other
- Cook PVI: R+6

North Carolina's 3rd congressional district is located on the Atlantic coast of North Carolina. It covers the Outer Banks and the counties adjacent to the Pamlico Sound.

The district is currently represented by Greg Murphy following a special election after the seat was left vacant following the passing of Walter B. Jones Jr. in February 2019. Jones had been the district's representative from 1995 until his death. A special election to fill the vacancy caused by Jones's death was held on September 10, 2019. State representative Greg Murphy won the election.

On February 23, 2022, the North Carolina Supreme Court had approved a new map that was only used for the 2022 United States House of Representatives elections in North Carolina which changed the 3rd district boundaries to include Duplin and Sampson counties and part of Wayne County while removing Chowan, Currituck, Dare, Greene, Pasquotank and Perquimans counties

On October 25, 2023 the North Carolina General Assembly had created and passed a new congressional map shifting the Cook Partisan Voting Index down by 4 points, only slightly changing the district's boundaries. At the time the district had a Cook Partisan Voting Index of R+10, which was one of the most Republican districts in North Carolina, tied with the 8th congressional district.

On October 22, 2025 the North Carolina General Assembly once again created and passed another new congressional map making the partisan lean of the neighboring 1st district more favorable to Republicans shifting the Cook Partisan Voting Index down another 4 points making the district an R+6.

== Counties and communities ==
For the 119th and successive Congresses (based on the districts drawn following a 2023 legislative session), the district contains all or portions of the following counties and communities.

Beaufort County (11)

All 11 communities

Carteret County (18)

All 18 communities

Craven County (13)

All 13 communities

Dare County (15)

All 15 communities

Duplin County (15)

All 15 communities

Hyde County (4)

All 4 communities

Jones County (3)

All three communities

Onslow County (10)

All ten communities

Pamlico County (10)

All 10 communities

Pitt County (13)

All 13 communities

Sampson County (14)

Bonnetsville, Clinton, Delway, Garland, Harrells, Ingold, Ivanhoe, Keener, Newton Grove, Roseboro, Salemburg, Spivey's Corner (part; also 7th), Turkey, Vann Crossroads

== Recent election results from statewide races ==
=== 2023–2027 boundaries ===
Year	Office	Results
2008	President	McCain 54% - 44%
2008	Senate	Dole 49% - 48%
2008	Governor	Perdue 55% - 42%
2010	Senate	Burr 60% - 38%
2012	President	Romney 57% - 43%
2012	Governor	McCrory 58% - 40%
2014	Senate	Tillis 55% - 41%
2016	President	Trump 57% - 39%
2016	Senate	Burr 58% - 38%
2016	Governor	McCrory 58% - 40%
2016	Lt. Governor	Forest 58% - 39%
2016	Secretary of State	LaPaglia 54% - 46%
2016	Auditor	Stuber 55% - 45%
2016	Treasurer	Folwell 59% - 41%
2016	Attorney General	Newton 57% - 43%
2020	President	Trump 58% - 41%
2020	Senate	Tillis 56% - 40%
2020	Governor	Forest 55% - 43%
2020	Lt. Governor	Robinson 59% - 41%
2020	Secretary of State	Sykes 56% - 44%
2020	Auditor	Street 56% - 44%
2020	Treasurer	Folwell 59% - 41%
2020	Attorney General	O'Neill 58% - 42%
2022	Senate	Budd 60% - 38%
2024	President	Trump 60% - 39%
2024	Governor	Robinson 49% - 46%
2024	Lt. Governor	Weatherman 56% - 41%
2024	Secretary of State	Brown 57% - 43%
2024	Auditor	Boliek 58% - 39%
2024	Treasurer	Briner 61% - 39%
2024	Attorney General	Bishop 58% - 42%

=== 2027–2033 boundaries ===
Year	Office	Results
2008	President	McCain 51% - 48%
2008	Senate	Hagan 52% - 46%
2008	Governor	Perdue 57% - 41%
2010	Senate	Burr 54% - 44%
2012	President	Romney 52% - 48%
2012	Governor	McCrory 53% - 45%
2014	Senate	Tillis 51% - 45%
2016	President	Trump 52% - 45%
2016	Senate	Burr 53% - 44%
2016	Governor	McCrory 53% - 45%
2016	Lt. Governor	Forest 53% - 45%
2016	Secretary of State	Marshall 52% - 48%
2016	Auditor	Wood 50.4% - 49.6%
2016	Treasurer	Folwell 53% - 47%
2016	Attorney General	Newton 52% - 48%
2020	President	Trump 53% - 45%
2020	Senate	Tillis 51% - 44%
2020	Governor	Forest 51% - 48%
2020	Lt. Governor	Robinson 55% - 45%
2020	Secretary of State	Sykes 51% - 49%
2020	Auditor	Street 51% - 49%
2020	Treasurer	Folwell 55% - 45%
2020	Attorney General	O'Neill 53% - 47%
2022	Senate	Budd 57% - 41%
2024	President	Trump 56% - 43%
2024	Governor	Stein 49% - 46%
2024	Lt. Governor	Weatherman 52% - 45%
2024	Secretary of State	Brown 53% - 47%
2024	Auditor	Boliek 54% - 43%
2024	Treasurer	Briner 56% - 44%
2024	Attorney General	Bishop 54% - 46%

== List of members representing the district ==
Member (Residence)	Party	Years	Cong ress	Electoral history	District location
District established April 6, 1790
Timothy Bloodworth (Wilmington)	Anti-Administration	April 6, 1790 – March 3, 1791	1st	Elected in 1790. Redistricted to the 5th district and lost re-election.	1790–1971 "Cape Fear division"
John B. Ashe (Halifax)	Anti-Administration	March 4, 1791 – March 3, 1793	2nd	Redistricted from the 1st district and re-elected in 1791. Redistricted to the 9th district.	1791–1973 [data missing]
Joseph Winston (Surry County)	Anti-Administration	March 4, 1793 – March 3, 1795	3rd	Elected in 1793. Lost re-election.	1793–1803 [data missing]
Jesse Franklin (Orange County)	Democratic-Republican	March 4, 1795 – March 3, 1797	4th	Elected in 1795. Lost re-election.	1793–1803 [data missing]
Robert Williams (Surry County)	Democratic-Republican	March 4, 1797 – March 3, 1803	5th 6th 7th	Elected in 1796. Re-elected in 1798. Re-elected in 1800. Redistricted to the 7th district and retired to run for governor of North Carolina.	1793–1803 [data missing]
William Kennedy (Washington)	Democratic-Republican	March 4, 1803 – March 3, 1805	8th	Elected in 1803. Lost re-election.	1803–1813 "North Carolina congressional district map (1803–13)".
Thomas Blount (Tarboro)	Democratic-Republican	March 4, 1805 – March 3, 1809	9th 10th	Elected in 1804. Re-elected in 1806. Lost re-election.	1803–1813 "North Carolina congressional district map (1803–13)".
William Kennedy (Washington)	Democratic-Republican	March 4, 1809 – March 3, 1811	11th	Elected in 1808. Retired.	1803–1813 "North Carolina congressional district map (1803–13)".
Thomas Blount (Tarboro)	Democratic-Republican	March 4, 1811 – February 7, 1812	12th	Elected in 1810. Died.	1803–1813 "North Carolina congressional district map (1803–13)".
Vacant		February 7, 1812 – January 30, 1813	12th		1803–1813 "North Carolina congressional district map (1803–13)".
William Kennedy (Washington)	Democratic-Republican	January 30, 1813 – March 3, 1815	13th	Elected January 11, 1813, to finish Blount's term and seated January 30, 1813. Re-elected in 1813. Retired.	1803–1813 "North Carolina congressional district map (1803–13)".
William Kennedy (Washington)	Democratic-Republican	January 30, 1813 – March 3, 1815	13th	Elected January 11, 1813, to finish Blount's term and seated January 30, 1813. Re-elected in 1813. Retired.	1813–1823 "North Carolina congressional district map (1813–43)".
James W. Clark (Tarboro)	Democratic-Republican	March 4, 1815 – March 3, 1817	14th	Elected in 1815. Retired.	1813–1823 "North Carolina congressional district map (1813–43)".
Thomas H. Hall (Tarboro)	Democratic-Republican	March 4, 1817 – March 3, 1825	15th 16th 17th 18th	Elected in 1817. Re-elected in 1819. Re-elected in 1821. Re-elected in 1823. Lost re-election.	1813–1823 "North Carolina congressional district map (1813–43)".
Thomas H. Hall (Tarboro)	Democratic-Republican	March 4, 1817 – March 3, 1825	15th 16th 17th 18th	Elected in 1817. Re-elected in 1819. Re-elected in 1821. Re-elected in 1823. Lost re-election.	1823–1833 "North Carolina congressional district map (1813–43)".
Richard Hines (Tarboro)	Jacksonian	March 4, 1825 – March 3, 1827	19th	Elected in 1825. Lost re-election.	1823–1833 "North Carolina congressional district map (1813–43)".
Thomas H. Hall (Tarboro)	Jacksonian	March 4, 1827 – March 3, 1835	20th 21st 22nd 23rd	Elected in 1827. Re-elected in 1829. Re-elected in 1831. Re-elected in 1833. [data missing]	1823–1833 "North Carolina congressional district map (1813–43)".
Thomas H. Hall (Tarboro)	Jacksonian	March 4, 1827 – March 3, 1835	20th 21st 22nd 23rd	Elected in 1827. Re-elected in 1829. Re-elected in 1831. Re-elected in 1833. [data missing]	1833–1843 "North Carolina congressional district map (1813–43)".
Ebenezer Pettigrew (Cool Springs)	Anti-Jacksonian	March 4, 1835 – March 3, 1837	24th	Elected in 1835. [data missing]	1833–1843 "North Carolina congressional district map (1813–43)".
Edward Stanly (Washington)	Whig	March 4, 1837 – March 3, 1843	25th 26th 27th	Elected in 1837. Re-elected in 1839. Re-elected in 1841. [data missing]	1833–1843 "North Carolina congressional district map (1813–43)".
David S. Reid (Reidsville)	Democratic	March 4, 1843 – March 3, 1847	28th 29th	Elected in 1843. Re-elected in 1845. [data missing]	1843–1853 [data missing]
Daniel M. Barringer (Concord)	Whig	March 4, 1847 – March 3, 1849	30th	Redistricted from the 2nd district and re-elected in 1847. [data missing]	1843–1853 [data missing]
Edmund Deberry (Mount Gilead)	Whig	March 4, 1849 – March 3, 1851	31st	Elected in 1849. [data missing]	1843–1853 [data missing]
Alfred Dockery (Dockery's Store)	Whig	March 4, 1851 – March 3, 1853	32nd	Elected in 1851. [data missing]	1843–1853 [data missing]
William S. Ashe (Wilmington)	Democratic	March 4, 1853 – March 3, 1855	33rd	Redistricted from the 7th district and re-elected in 1853. [data missing]	1853–1861 [data missing]
Warren Winslow (Fayetteville)	Democratic	March 4, 1855 – March 3, 1861	34th 35th 36th	Elected in 1855. Re-elected in 1857. Re-elected in 1859. [data missing]	1853–1861 [data missing]
Vacant		March 3, 1861 – July 13, 1868	37th 38th 39th 40th	Civil War and Reconstruction	
Oliver H. Dockery (Mangum)	Republican	July 13, 1868 – March 3, 1871	40th 41st	Elected to finish the short term. Re-elected in 1868. [data missing]	1868–1873 [data missing]
Alfred M. Waddell (Wilmington)	Democratic	March 4, 1871 – March 3, 1879	42nd 43rd 44th 45th	Elected in 1870. Re-elected in 1872. Re-elected in 1874. Re-elected in 1876. [data missing]	1868–1873 [data missing]
Alfred M. Waddell (Wilmington)	Democratic	March 4, 1871 – March 3, 1879	42nd 43rd 44th 45th	Elected in 1870. Re-elected in 1872. Re-elected in 1874. Re-elected in 1876. [data missing]	1873–1883 [data missing]
Daniel L. Russell (Wilmington)	Greenback	March 4, 1879 – March 3, 1881	46th	Elected in 1878. [data missing]	1873–1883 [data missing]
John W. Shackelford (Jacksonville)	Democratic	March 4, 1881 – January 18, 1883	47th	Elected in 1880. Died.	1873–1883 [data missing]
Vacant		January 18, 1883 – March 3, 1883	47th		1873–1883 [data missing]
Wharton J. Green (Fayetteville)	Democratic	March 4, 1883 – March 3, 1887	48th 49th	Elected in 1882. Re-elected in 1884. [data missing]	1883–1893 [data missing]
Charles W. McClammy (Scotts Hill)	Democratic	March 4, 1887 – March 3, 1891	50th 51st	Elected in 1886. Re-elected in 1888. [data missing]	1883–1893 [data missing]
Benjamin F. Grady (Wallace)	Democratic	March 4, 1891 – March 3, 1895	52nd 53rd	Elected in 1890. Re-elected in 1892. [data missing]	1883–1893 [data missing]
Benjamin F. Grady (Wallace)	Democratic	March 4, 1891 – March 3, 1895	52nd 53rd	Elected in 1890. Re-elected in 1892. [data missing]	1893–1903 [data missing]
John G. Shaw (Fayetteville)	Democratic	March 4, 1895 – March 3, 1897	54th	Elected in 1894. [data missing]	1893–1903 [data missing]
John E. Fowler (Clinton)	Populist	March 4, 1897 – March 3, 1899	55th	Elected in 1896. [data missing]	1893–1903 [data missing]
Charles R. Thomas (New Bern)	Democratic	March 4, 1899 – March 3, 1911	56th 57th 58th 59th 60th 61st	Elected in 1898. Re-elected in 1900. Re-elected in 1902. Re-elected in 1904. Re-elected in 1906. Re-elected in 1908. [data missing]	1893–1903 [data missing]
Charles R. Thomas (New Bern)	Democratic	March 4, 1899 – March 3, 1911	56th 57th 58th 59th 60th 61st	Elected in 1898. Re-elected in 1900. Re-elected in 1902. Re-elected in 1904. Re-elected in 1906. Re-elected in 1908. [data missing]	1903–1913 [data missing]
John M. Faison (Faison)	Democratic	March 4, 1911 – March 3, 1915	62nd 63rd	Elected in 1910. Re-elected in 1912. Retired.	1903–1913 [data missing]
John M. Faison (Faison)	Democratic	March 4, 1911 – March 3, 1915	62nd 63rd	Elected in 1910. Re-elected in 1912. Retired.	1913–1933 [data missing]
George E. Hood (Goldsboro)	Democratic	March 4, 1915 – March 3, 1919	64th 65th	Elected in 1914. Re-elected in 1916. [data missing]	1913–1933 [data missing]
Samuel M. Brinson (New Bern)	Democratic	March 4, 1919 – April 13, 1922	66th 67th	Elected in 1918. Re-elected in 1920. Died.	1913–1933 [data missing]
Vacant		April 13, 1922 – November 7, 1922	67th		1913–1933 [data missing]
Charles L. Abernethy (New Bern)	Democratic	November 7, 1922 – January 3, 1935	67th 68th 69th 70th 71st 72nd 73rd	Elected to finish Brinson's term. Re-elected in 1922. Re-elected in 1924. Re-elected in 1926. Re-elected in 1928. Re-elected in 1930. Re-elected in 1932. Lost renomination.	1913–1933 [data missing]
Charles L. Abernethy (New Bern)	Democratic	November 7, 1922 – January 3, 1935	67th 68th 69th 70th 71st 72nd 73rd	Elected to finish Brinson's term. Re-elected in 1922. Re-elected in 1924. Re-elected in 1926. Re-elected in 1928. Re-elected in 1930. Re-elected in 1932. Lost renomination.	1933–1943 [data missing]
Graham A. Barden (New Bern)	Democratic	January 3, 1935 – January 3, 1961	74th 75th 76th 77th 78th 79th 80th 81st 82nd 83rd 84th 85th 86th	Elected in 1934. Re-elected in 1936. Re-elected in 1938. Re-elected in 1940. Re-elected in 1942. Re-elected in 1944. Re-elected in 1946. Re-elected in 1948. Re-elected in 1950. Re-elected in 1952. Re-elected in 1954. Re-elected in 1956. Re-elected in 1958. Retired.	1933–1943 [data missing]
Graham A. Barden (New Bern)	Democratic	January 3, 1935 – January 3, 1961	74th 75th 76th 77th 78th 79th 80th 81st 82nd 83rd 84th 85th 86th	Elected in 1934. Re-elected in 1936. Re-elected in 1938. Re-elected in 1940. Re-elected in 1942. Re-elected in 1944. Re-elected in 1946. Re-elected in 1948. Re-elected in 1950. Re-elected in 1952. Re-elected in 1954. Re-elected in 1956. Re-elected in 1958. Retired.	1943–1953 [data missing]
Graham A. Barden (New Bern)	Democratic	January 3, 1935 – January 3, 1961	74th 75th 76th 77th 78th 79th 80th 81st 82nd 83rd 84th 85th 86th	Elected in 1934. Re-elected in 1936. Re-elected in 1938. Re-elected in 1940. Re-elected in 1942. Re-elected in 1944. Re-elected in 1946. Re-elected in 1948. Re-elected in 1950. Re-elected in 1952. Re-elected in 1954. Re-elected in 1956. Re-elected in 1958. Retired.	1953–1963 [data missing]
David N. Henderson (Wallace)	Democratic	January 3, 1961 – January 3, 1977	87th 88th 89th 90th 91st 92nd 93rd 94th	Elected in 1960. Re-elected in 1962. Re-elected in 1964. Re-elected in 1966. Re-elected in 1968. Re-elected in 1970. Re-elected in 1972. Re-elected in 1974. Retired.	1953–1963 [data missing]
David N. Henderson (Wallace)	Democratic	January 3, 1961 – January 3, 1977	87th 88th 89th 90th 91st 92nd 93rd 94th	Elected in 1960. Re-elected in 1962. Re-elected in 1964. Re-elected in 1966. Re-elected in 1968. Re-elected in 1970. Re-elected in 1972. Re-elected in 1974. Retired.	1963–1973 [data missing]
David N. Henderson (Wallace)	Democratic	January 3, 1961 – January 3, 1977	87th 88th 89th 90th 91st 92nd 93rd 94th	Elected in 1960. Re-elected in 1962. Re-elected in 1964. Re-elected in 1966. Re-elected in 1968. Re-elected in 1970. Re-elected in 1972. Re-elected in 1974. Retired.	1973–1983 [data missing]
Charles O. Whitley (Mount Olive)	Democratic	January 3, 1977 – December 31, 1986	95th 96th 97th 98th 99th	Elected in 1976. Re-elected in 1978. Re-elected in 1980. Re-elected in 1982. Re-elected in 1984. Resigned.	1973–1983 [data missing]
Charles O. Whitley (Mount Olive)	Democratic	January 3, 1977 – December 31, 1986	95th 96th 97th 98th 99th	Elected in 1976. Re-elected in 1978. Re-elected in 1980. Re-elected in 1982. Re-elected in 1984. Resigned.	1983–1993 [data missing]
Vacant		December 31, 1986 – January 3, 1987	99th		1983–1993 [data missing]
Martin Lancaster (Goldsboro)	Democratic	January 3, 1987 – January 3, 1995	100th 101st 102nd 103rd	Elected in 1986. Re-elected in 1988. Re-elected in 1990. Re-elected in 1992. Lost re-election.	1983–1993 [data missing]
Martin Lancaster (Goldsboro)	Democratic	January 3, 1987 – January 3, 1995	100th 101st 102nd 103rd	Elected in 1986. Re-elected in 1988. Re-elected in 1990. Re-elected in 1992. Lost re-election.	1993–2003 [data missing]
Walter B. Jones Jr. (Farmville)	Republican	January 3, 1995 – February 10, 2019	104th 105th 106th 107th 108th 109th 110th 111th 112th 113th 114th 115th 116th	Elected in 1994. Re-elected in 1996. Re-elected in 1998. Re-elected in 2000. Re-elected in 2002. Re-elected in 2004. Re-elected in 2006. Re-elected in 2008. Re-elected in 2010. Re-elected in 2012. Re-elected in 2014. Re-elected in 2016. Re-elected in 2018. Died.	1993–2003 [data missing]
Walter B. Jones Jr. (Farmville)	Republican	January 3, 1995 – February 10, 2019	104th 105th 106th 107th 108th 109th 110th 111th 112th 113th 114th 115th 116th	Elected in 1994. Re-elected in 1996. Re-elected in 1998. Re-elected in 2000. Re-elected in 2002. Re-elected in 2004. Re-elected in 2006. Re-elected in 2008. Re-elected in 2010. Re-elected in 2012. Re-elected in 2014. Re-elected in 2016. Re-elected in 2018. Died.	2003–2013
Walter B. Jones Jr. (Farmville)	Republican	January 3, 1995 – February 10, 2019	104th 105th 106th 107th 108th 109th 110th 111th 112th 113th 114th 115th 116th	Elected in 1994. Re-elected in 1996. Re-elected in 1998. Re-elected in 2000. Re-elected in 2002. Re-elected in 2004. Re-elected in 2006. Re-elected in 2008. Re-elected in 2010. Re-elected in 2012. Re-elected in 2014. Re-elected in 2016. Re-elected in 2018. Died.	2013–2017
Walter B. Jones Jr. (Farmville)	Republican	January 3, 1995 – February 10, 2019	104th 105th 106th 107th 108th 109th 110th 111th 112th 113th 114th 115th 116th	Elected in 1994. Re-elected in 1996. Re-elected in 1998. Re-elected in 2000. Re-elected in 2002. Re-elected in 2004. Re-elected in 2006. Re-elected in 2008. Re-elected in 2010. Re-elected in 2012. Re-elected in 2014. Re-elected in 2016. Re-elected in 2018. Died.	2017–2021
Vacant		February 10, 2019 – September 10, 2019	116th		2017–2021
Greg Murphy (Greenville)	Republican	September 10, 2019 – present	116th 117th 118th 119th	Elected to finish Jones's term. Re-elected in 2020. Re-elected in 2022. Re-elected in 2024. Lost re-election.	2017–2021
Greg Murphy (Greenville)	Republican	September 10, 2019 – present	116th 117th 118th 119th	Elected to finish Jones's term. Re-elected in 2020. Re-elected in 2022. Re-elected in 2024. Lost re-election.	2021–2023 Static map of 2021-3 congressional district
Greg Murphy (Greenville)	Republican	September 10, 2019 – present	116th 117th 118th 119th	Elected to finish Jones's term. Re-elected in 2020. Re-elected in 2022. Re-elected in 2024. Lost re-election.	2023–2025
Greg Murphy (Greenville)	Republican	September 10, 2019 – present	116th 117th 118th 119th	Elected to finish Jones's term. Re-elected in 2020. Re-elected in 2022. Re-elected in 2024. Lost re-election.	2025–2027
Raymond Smith Jr. (Goldsboro)	Democratic	Taking office on January 3, 2027		Elected in 2026.	2027–present

== Past election results ==
=== 2000 ===
2000 North Carolina's 3rd congressional district election
Party	Candidate	Votes	%
Republican	Walter B. Jones (incumbent)	121,940	61.4
Democratic	Leigh McNairy	74,058	37.3
Libertarian	David Russell	2,457	1.2
Total votes		198,455	100
Republican hold			

=== 2002 ===
2002 North Carolina's 3rd congressional district election
Party	Candidate	Votes	%
Republican	Walter B. Jones (incumbent)	131,448	90.7
Libertarian	Gary Goodson	13,486	9.3
Total votes		144,934	100
Republican hold			

=== 2004 ===
2004 North Carolina's 3rd congressional district election
Party	Candidate	Votes	%
Republican	Walter B. Jones (incumbent)	171,863	70.7
Democratic	Roger A. Eaton	71,227	29.3
Total votes		243,090	100
Republican hold			

=== 2006 ===
2006 North Carolina's 3rd congressional district election
Party	Candidate	Votes	%
Republican	Walter B. Jones (incumbent)	99,519	68.64
Democratic	Craig Weber	45,458	31.36
Total votes		144,977	100
Republican hold			

=== 2008 ===
2008 North Carolina's 3rd congressional district election
Party	Candidate	Votes	%
Republican	Walter B. Jones (incumbent)	201,686	65.9
Democratic	Craig Weber	104,364	34.1
Total votes		306,050	100
Republican hold			

=== 2010 ===
2010 North Carolina's 3rd congressional district election
Party	Candidate	Votes	%
Republican	Walter B. Jones (incumbent)	143,225	71.86
Democratic	Johnny G. Rouse	51,317	25.75
Libertarian	Darryl Holloman	4,762	2.39
Total votes		199,304	100
Republican hold			

=== 2012 ===
2012 North Carolina's 3rd congressional district election
Party	Candidate	Votes	%
Republican	Walter B. Jones (incumbent)	195,571	63.11
Democratic	Erik Anderson	114,314	36.89
Total votes		309,885	100
Republican hold			

=== 2014 ===
2014 North Carolina's 3rd congressional district election
Party	Candidate	Votes	%
Republican	Walter B. Jones (incumbent)	139,415	67.81
Democratic	Marshall Adame	66,182	32.19
Total votes		205,597	100
Republican hold			

=== 2016 ===
North Carolina's 3rd congressional district, 2016
Party	Candidate	Votes	%
Republican	Walter B. Jones (incumbent)	217,531	67.2
Democratic	Ernest T. Reeves	106,170	32.8
Total votes		323,701	100
Republican hold			

=== 2018 ===
North Carolina's 3rd congressional district, 2018
Party	Candidate	Votes	%
Republican	Walter B. Jones (incumbent)	186,353	100.0
Total votes		186,353	100.0
Republican hold			

=== 2019 special election ===
2019 North Carolina's 3rd congressional district special election
Party	Candidate	Votes	%
Republican	Greg Murphy	70,407	61.74
Democratic	Allen Thomas	42,738	37.47
Constitution	Greg Holt	507	0.44
Libertarian	Tim Harris	394	0.35
Total votes		114,046	100.0
Republican hold			

=== 2020 ===
2020 North Carolina's 3rd congressional district election
Party	Candidate	Votes	%
Republican	Greg Murphy (incumbent)	229,800	63.4
Democratic	Daryl Farrow	132,752	36.6
Total votes		362,552	100.0
Republican hold			

=== 2022 ===
2022 North Carolina's 3rd congressional district election
Party	Candidate	Votes	%
Republican	Greg Murphy (incumbent)	166,520	66.9%
Democratic	Barbara Gaskins	82,378	33.1%
Total votes		247,898	100.0%
Republican hold			

=== 2024 ===
2024 North Carolina's 3rd congressional district election
Party	Candidate	Votes	%
Republican	Greg Murphy (incumbent)	248,276	77.4
Libertarian	Gheorghe Cormos	72,565	22.6
Total votes		320,841	100.0
Republican hold			

== See also ==
- List of United States congressional districts
- North Carolina's congressional districts
