= Plainview =

Plainview or Plain View may refer to:

== Places in the United States ==
- Plainview, Arkansas
- Plainview, California
- Plainview, Georgia
- Plainview, Illinois
- Plainview, Louisville, Kentucky
- Plainview, Minnesota
- Plainview, Nebraska
- Plainview, New York
- Plain View, North Carolina
- Plainview, South Dakota
- Plainview, Tennessee
- Plainview, Texas
- Plainview, Wharton County, Texas
- Plain View, King and Queen County, Virginia
- Plain View, Powhatan County, Virginia
- Plainview Township (disambiguation)

== Other uses ==
- USS Plainview, a hydrofoil

== See also ==
- Plain view doctrine
- Plainview point, a Paleo-Indian projectile point
