= 1904 United States presidential election in North Carolina =

- November 8, 1904
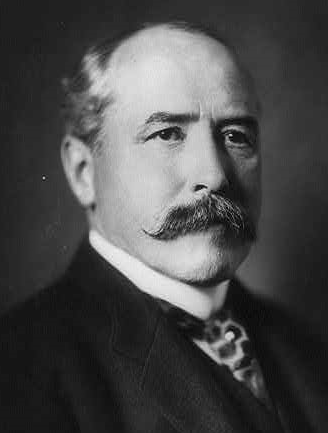

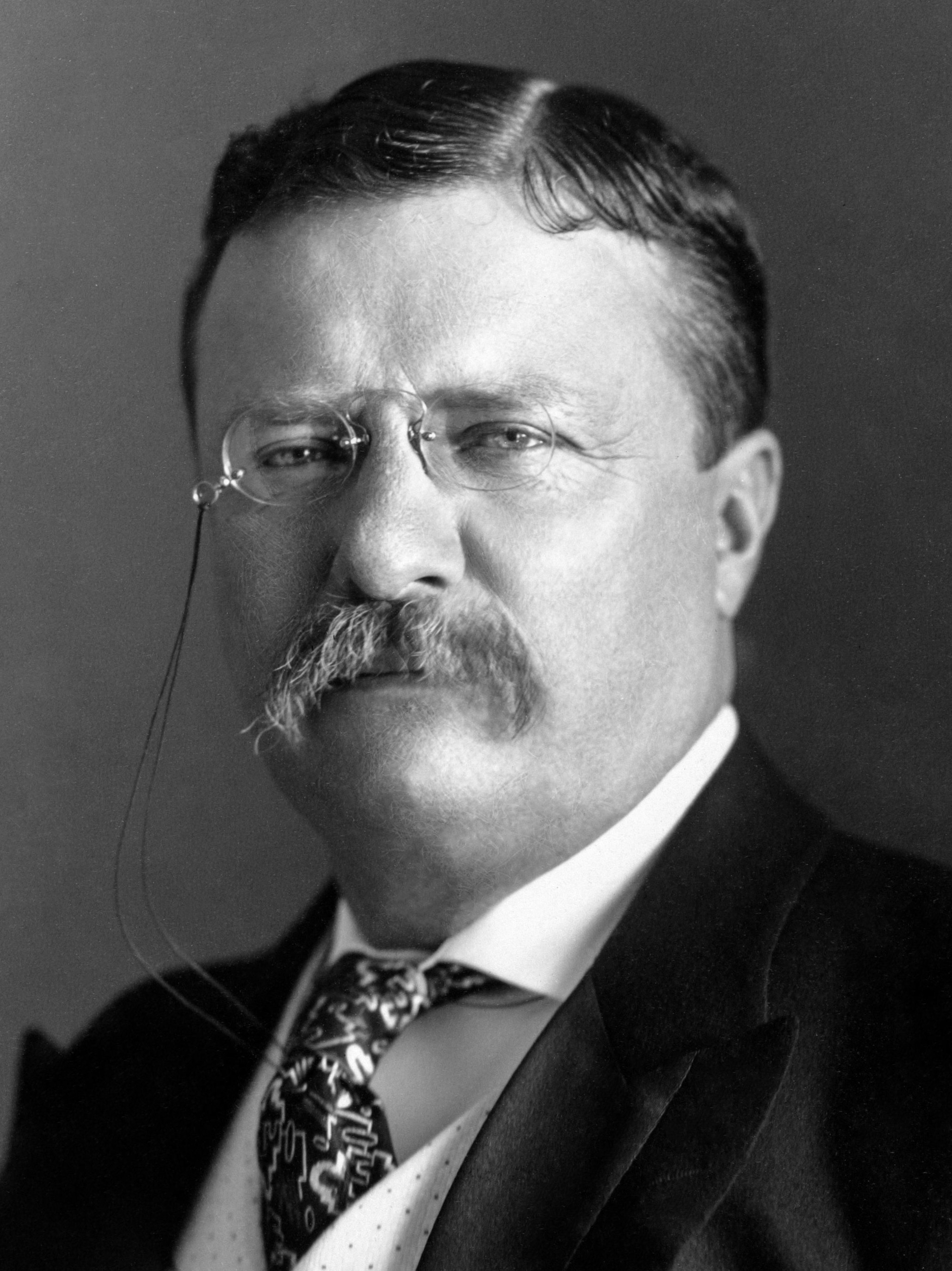
Nominee	Alton B. Parker	Theodore Roosevelt
Party	Democratic	Republican
Home state	New York	New York
Running mate	Henry G. Davis	Charles W. Fairbanks
Electoral vote	12	0
Popular vote	124,091	82,442
Percentage	59.71%	39.67%
County results
Parker
40–50%
50–60%
60–70%
70–80%
80–90%
90–100%
Roosevelt
50–60%
60–70%
70–80%
President before election
Theodore Roosevelt
Republican
Elected President
Theodore Roosevelt
Republican

The 1904 United States presidential election in North Carolina took place on November 8, 1904. All contemporary 45 states were part of the 1904 United States presidential election. Voters chose 12 electors to the Electoral College, which selected the president and vice president.

Following the 1898 overthrow of its Populist/Republican fusion government by white Democrats in the Wilmington massacre, North Carolina would see a radical restructuring of its politics due to the disenfranchisement of its large African-American population. These African-American voters had provided a substantial proportion of Republican Party support ever since that party first appeared in the state following Reconstruction. However, unlike the Deep South, even without black voting the Republican Party retained substantial support from whites in the mountain and northwestern Piedmont areas that had resisted secession and viewed the Democratic Party as a “war party”. This would allow the GOP, without threatening statewide Democratic hegemony, to gain one-third of the statewide vote in general elections.

This radically altered Republican Party would turn almost overnight towards a “lily-white” strategy based on attempting to appeal to businessmen who found the Democratic Party too anti-business and too favorable to using low-cost black labor instead of whites. The GOP had to some extent followed this strategy in the years before black disenfranchisement because it wanted to appeal to the state's budding industrialists, who were critical of Democratic policies favoring free trade over high tariffs. Although this strategy had allowed William McKinley to retain almost the same share of North Carolina's reduced electorate in 1900 that he had won with large-scale black voting in 1896, Republican nominee Theodore Roosevelt would decline substantially in 1904, due to a shift to a more pro-business Democratic candidate and opposition to Roosevelt's hosting of Booker T. Washington. The Republicans were reduced to their traditionally Unionist mountain strongholds, with the exception of former Populist Senator Marion Butler's home county of Sampson, which persisted in its newfound Republican orientation.

North Carolina was won by the Democratic nominees, Chief Judge Alton B. Parker of New York and his running mate Henry G. Davis of West Virginia. They defeated the Republican nominees, incumbent President Theodore Roosevelt of New York and his running mate Senator Charles W. Fairbanks of Indiana. Parker won the state by a margin of 20.04%.

== Results ==
1904 United States presidential election in North Carolina
Party	Candidate	Votes	Percentage	Electoral votes
Democratic	Alton B. Parker	124,091	59.71%	12
Republican	Theodore Roosevelt (incumbent)	82,442	39.67%	0
Populist	Thomas E. Watson	819	0.39%	0
Prohibition	Silas C. Swallow	342	0.16%	0
Socialist	Eugene V. Debs	124	0.06%	0
Totals		207,818	100.00%	12
Voter turnout				—

=== Results by county ===
1904 United States presidential election in North Carolina by county
County	Alton Brooks Parker Democratic		Theodore Roosevelt Republican		Thomas Edward Watson Populist		Silas Comfort Swallow Prohibition		Eugene Victor Debs Socialist		Margin	
County	%	#	%	#	%	#	%	#	%	#	%	#
Currituck	94.27%	543	5.73%	33	0.00%	0	0.00%	0	0.00%	0	88.54%	510
New Hanover	93.23%	1,254	6.77%	91	0.00%	0	0.00%	0	0.00%	0	86.47%	1,163
Halifax	93.06%	2,427	6.94%	181	0.00%	0	0.00%	0	0.00%	0	86.12%	2,246
Northampton	92.86%	1,509	7.14%	116	0.00%	0	0.00%	0	0.00%	0	85.72%	1,393
Edgecombe	90.07%	1,588	7.15%	126	2.72%	48	0.06%	1	0.00%	0	82.93%	1,462
Scotland	90.86%	646	9.14%	65	0.00%	0	0.00%	0	0.00%	0	81.72%	581
Franklin	88.16%	2,099	11.84%	282	0.00%	0	0.00%	0	0.00%	0	76.31%	1,817
Martin	86.79%	1,419	13.21%	216	0.00%	0	0.00%	0	0.00%	0	73.58%	1,203
Warren	85.35%	1,060	13.29%	165	1.37%	17	0.00%	0	0.00%	0	72.06%	895
Craven	85.30%	1,555	14.70%	268	0.00%	0	0.00%	0	0.00%	0	70.60%	1,287
Anson	84.90%	1,226	14.34%	207	0.76%	11	0.00%	0	0.00%	0	70.57%	1,019
Pender	84.31%	903	15.69%	168	0.00%	0	0.00%	0	0.00%	0	68.63%	735
Pitt	83.93%	2,329	15.46%	429	0.54%	15	0.07%	2	0.00%	0	68.47%	1,900
Bertie	83.16%	1,264	16.58%	252	0.26%	4	0.00%	0	0.00%	0	66.58%	1,012
Caswell	81.30%	874	18.70%	201	0.00%	0	0.00%	0	0.00%	0	62.60%	673
Hertford	80.29%	778	19.20%	186	0.52%	5	0.00%	0	0.00%	0	61.09%	592
Mecklenburg	79.87%	3,142	19.01%	748	0.84%	33	0.25%	10	0.03%	1	60.85%	2,394
Camden	79.71%	389	20.29%	99	0.00%	0	0.00%	0	0.00%	0	59.43%	290
Chowan	79.47%	573	20.53%	148	0.00%	0	0.00%	0	0.00%	0	58.95%	425
Pasquotank	77.37%	947	22.47%	275	0.08%	1	0.08%	1	0.00%	0	54.90%	672
Greene	77.03%	949	22.97%	283	0.00%	0	0.00%	0	0.00%	0	54.06%	666
Granville	75.27%	1,595	24.45%	518	0.28%	6	0.00%	0	0.00%	0	50.83%	1,077
Union	74.75%	1,181	23.99%	379	1.27%	20	0.00%	0	0.00%	0	50.76%	802
Richmond	75.18%	927	24.82%	306	0.00%	0	0.00%	0	0.00%	0	50.36%	621
Wake	72.55%	3,410	26.96%	1,267	0.34%	16	0.15%	7	0.00%	0	45.60%	2,143
Jones	71.77%	638	28.12%	250	0.11%	1	0.00%	0	0.00%	0	43.64%	388
Gates	71.26%	677	28.74%	273	0.00%	0	0.00%	0	0.00%	0	42.53%	404
Robeson	69.71%	2,274	30.10%	982	0.18%	6	0.00%	0	0.00%	0	39.61%	1,292
Vance	69.41%	1,019	30.18%	443	0.41%	6	0.00%	0	0.00%	0	39.24%	576
Nash	68.69%	1,428	31.02%	645	0.29%	6	0.00%	0	0.00%	0	37.66%	783
Wilson	68.63%	1,363	31.37%	623	0.00%	0	0.00%	0	0.00%	0	37.26%	740
Gaston	68.01%	1,958	31.12%	896	0.42%	12	0.45%	13	0.00%	0	36.89%	1,062
Cleveland	67.52%	2,162	32.35%	1,036	0.12%	4	0.00%	0	0.00%	0	35.17%	1,126
Beaufort	67.53%	1,803	32.47%	867	0.00%	0	0.00%	0	0.00%	0	35.06%	936
Lenoir	67.25%	1,386	32.70%	674	0.00%	0	0.05%	1	0.00%	0	34.55%	712
Person	66.57%	942	33.43%	473	0.00%	0	0.00%	0	0.00%	0	33.14%	469
Rowan	66.25%	2,424	33.21%	1,215	0.11%	4	0.44%	16	0.00%	0	33.04%	1,209
Hyde	65.88%	614	34.12%	318	0.00%	0	0.00%	0	0.00%	0	31.76%	296
Onslow	62.02%	828	33.78%	451	4.19%	56	0.00%	0	0.00%	0	28.24%	377
Wayne	63.27%	2,060	35.69%	1,162	0.06%	2	0.98%	32	0.00%	0	27.58%	898
Duplin	61.68%	1,386	36.27%	815	2.05%	46	0.00%	0	0.00%	0	25.41%	571
Johnston	62.35%	2,572	37.65%	1,553	0.00%	0	0.00%	0	0.00%	0	24.70%	1,019
Columbus	62.29%	1,447	37.71%	876	0.00%	0	0.00%	0	0.00%	0	24.58%	571
Bladen	61.39%	927	36.95%	558	1.66%	25	0.00%	0	0.00%	0	24.44%	369
Perquimans	61.68%	610	38.22%	378	0.00%	0	0.10%	1	0.00%	0	23.46%	232
Guilford	61.40%	2,763	38.13%	1,716	0.00%	0	0.47%	21	0.00%	0	23.27%	1,047
Harnett	60.79%	1,169	37.60%	723	1.30%	25	0.31%	6	0.00%	0	23.19%	446
Orange	60.69%	900	37.63%	558	1.69%	25	0.00%	0	0.00%	0	23.06%	342
Carteret	60.67%	1,012	39.33%	656	0.00%	0	0.00%	0	0.00%	0	21.34%	356
Rockingham	59.88%	1,934	39.50%	1,276	0.59%	19	0.00%	0	0.03%	1	20.37%	658
Durham	59.52%	1,603	40.10%	1,080	0.00%	0	0.37%	10	0.00%	0	19.42%	523
Haywood	59.18%	1,631	40.82%	1,125	0.00%	0	0.00%	0	0.00%	0	18.36%	506
Cumberland	58.41%	1,594	41.37%	1,129	0.22%	6	0.00%	0	0.00%	0	17.04%	465
Rutherford	58.45%	1,860	41.55%	1,322	0.00%	0	0.00%	0	0.00%	0	16.91%	538
Iredell	57.83%	2,126	41.08%	1,510	1.09%	40	0.00%	0	0.00%	0	16.76%	616
Lincoln	56.65%	1,009	42.73%	761	0.62%	11	0.00%	0	0.00%	0	13.92%	248
Pamlico	56.72%	574	43.28%	438	0.00%	0	0.00%	0	0.00%	0	13.44%	136
Randolph	56.07%	2,334	43.43%	1,808	0.00%	0	0.50%	21	0.00%	0	12.64%	526
Alleghany	56.28%	699	43.72%	543	0.00%	0	0.00%	0	0.00%	0	12.56%	156
Buncombe	54.88%	3,181	44.70%	2,591	0.00%	0	0.00%	0	0.41%	24	10.18%	590
Moore	54.25%	1,424	44.88%	1,178	0.69%	18	0.19%	5	0.00%	0	9.37%	246
Cabarrus	53.80%	1,509	44.71%	1,254	1.43%	40	0.07%	2	0.00%	0	9.09%	255
Dare	54.25%	415	45.75%	350	0.00%	0	0.00%	0	0.00%	0	8.50%	65
Yancey	53.97%	1,013	46.03%	864	0.00%	0	0.00%	0	0.00%	0	7.94%	149
Brunswick	53.66%	564	46.34%	487	0.00%	0	0.00%	0	0.00%	0	7.33%	77
Catawba	48.57%	1,497	42.47%	1,309	7.62%	235	1.33%	41	0.00%	0	6.10%	188
Montgomery	52.20%	937	47.80%	858	0.00%	0	0.00%	0	0.00%	0	4.40%	79
Burke	51.90%	1,080	48.10%	1,001	0.00%	0	0.00%	0	0.00%	0	3.80%	79
Alamance	51.83%	1,907	48.11%	1,770	0.00%	0	0.05%	2	0.00%	0	3.72%	137
Jackson	51.47%	1,015	48.02%	947	0.51%	10	0.00%	0	0.00%	0	3.45%	68
Transylvania	51.39%	556	48.61%	526	0.00%	0	0.00%	0	0.00%	0	2.77%	30
Washington	51.25%	450	48.75%	428	0.00%	0	0.00%	0	0.00%	0	2.51%	22
Chatham	51.05%	1,551	48.62%	1,477	0.30%	9	0.03%	1	0.00%	0	2.44%	74
Forsyth	49.93%	2,301	47.94%	2,209	0.00%	0	0.00%	0	2.13%	98	2.00%	92
Clay	50.37%	336	48.73%	325	0.00%	0	0.90%	6	0.00%	0	1.65%	11
Davidson	49.21%	2,017	50.11%	2,054	0.00%	0	0.68%	28	0.00%	0	-0.90%	-37
Stanly	48.67%	1,024	51.33%	1,080	0.00%	0	0.00%	0	0.00%	0	-2.66%	-56
Tyrrell	48.31%	343	51.69%	367	0.00%	0	0.00%	0	0.00%	0	-3.38%	-24
Macon	47.70%	904	52.08%	987	0.11%	2	0.11%	2	0.00%	0	-4.38%	-83
Graham	47.44%	362	52.56%	401	0.00%	0	0.00%	0	0.00%	0	-5.11%	-39
McDowell	46.65%	836	51.95%	931	0.45%	8	0.95%	17	0.00%	0	-5.30%	-95
Polk	47.06%	497	52.94%	559	0.00%	0	0.00%	0	0.00%	0	-5.87%	-62
Caldwell	44.47%	1,169	53.97%	1,419	0.46%	12	1.10%	29	0.00%	0	-9.51%	-250
Alexander	45.08%	770	54.86%	937	0.06%	1	0.00%	0	0.00%	0	-9.78%	-167
Ashe	42.99%	1,254	56.60%	1,651	0.00%	0	0.41%	12	0.00%	0	-13.61%	-397
Stokes	42.76%	1,104	57.24%	1,478	0.00%	0	0.00%	0	0.00%	0	-14.48%	-374
Surry	41.30%	1,741	58.70%	2,475	0.00%	0	0.00%	0	0.00%	0	-17.41%	-734
Davie	40.23%	739	58.36%	1,072	0.33%	6	1.09%	20	0.00%	0	-18.13%	-333
Watauga	39.70%	773	58.71%	1,143	0.10%	2	1.49%	29	0.00%	0	-19.00%	-370
Cherokee	40.35%	663	59.65%	980	0.00%	0	0.00%	0	0.00%	0	-19.29%	-317
Henderson	39.81%	887	60.19%	1,341	0.00%	0	0.00%	0	0.00%	0	-20.38%	-454
Sampson	37.78%	1,079	62.22%	1,777	0.00%	0	0.00%	0	0.00%	0	-24.44%	-698
Swain	37.60%	499	62.40%	828	0.00%	0	0.00%	0	0.00%	0	-24.79%	-329
Wilkes	34.79%	1,318	65.21%	2,470	0.00%	0	0.00%	0	0.00%	0	-30.41%	-1,152
Madison	33.66%	994	66.34%	1,959	0.00%	0	0.00%	0	0.00%	0	-32.68%	-965
Yadkin	32.41%	691	67.21%	1,433	0.09%	2	0.28%	6	0.00%	0	-34.80%	-742
Mitchell	22.77%	408	77.23%	1,384	0.00%	0	0.00%	0	0.00%	0	-54.46%	-976

== See also ==
- United States presidential elections in North Carolina
