= Herring Township, Sampson County, North Carolina =

Herring Township
- Township
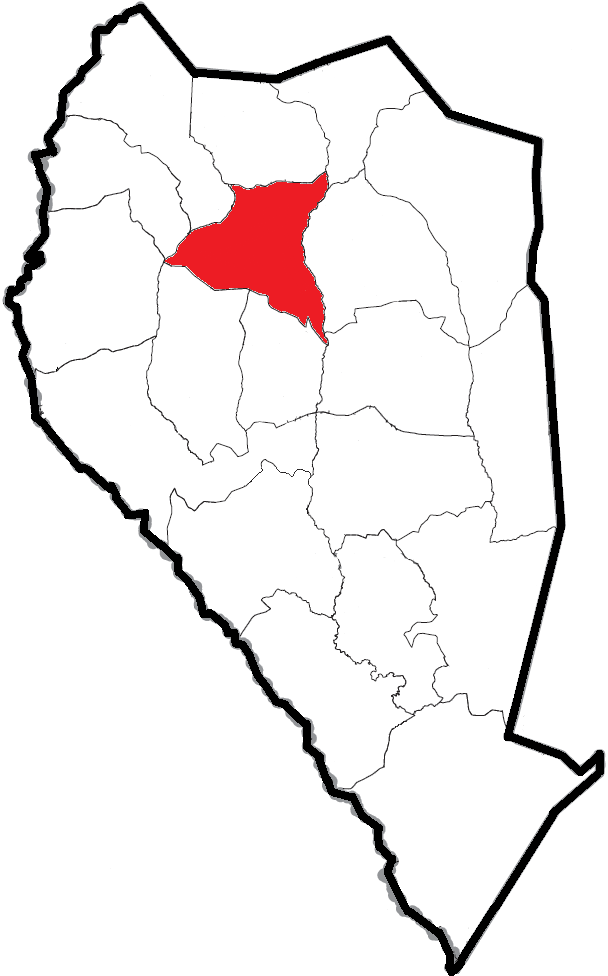
- Location of Herring Township within Sampson County

- Location of Sampson County within North Carolina
- Country: United States
- State: North Carolina
- County: Sampson

Area
  - Total: 38.5 sq mi (100 km^{2})

Population (2020)
  - Total: 1,758
- Time zone: UTC-5 (EST)
  - Summer (DST): UTC-4 (EDT)
- Area codes: 910, 472

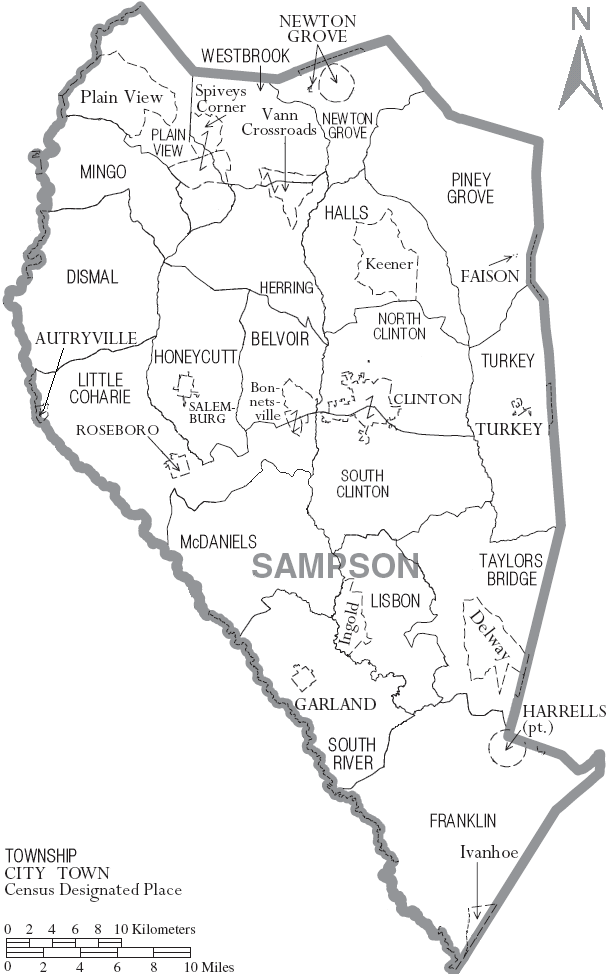
Map of Sampson County with municipal and townships labels

Herring Township is a township in Sampson County, North Carolina, United States.

== Geography and population ==
Herring Township is one of 19 townships within Sampson County. It is 38.5 square miles (100 km^{2}) in total area.

In 2020, the population of Herring Township was 1,758.

In 2022, the estimated population of the township was 1,671.

Communities within Herring Township include Piney Green and Vann Crossroads.

The township is bordered to the northwest by Mingo Township and Plain View Township, to the north by Westbrook Township, to the northeast by Newton Grove Township, to the east by Halls Township, to the southeast by North Clinton Township, to the south by Belvoir Township and Honeycutt Township, and to the southwest by Dismal Township.
