= Belvoir Township, Sampson County, North Carolina =

Belvoir Township
- Township
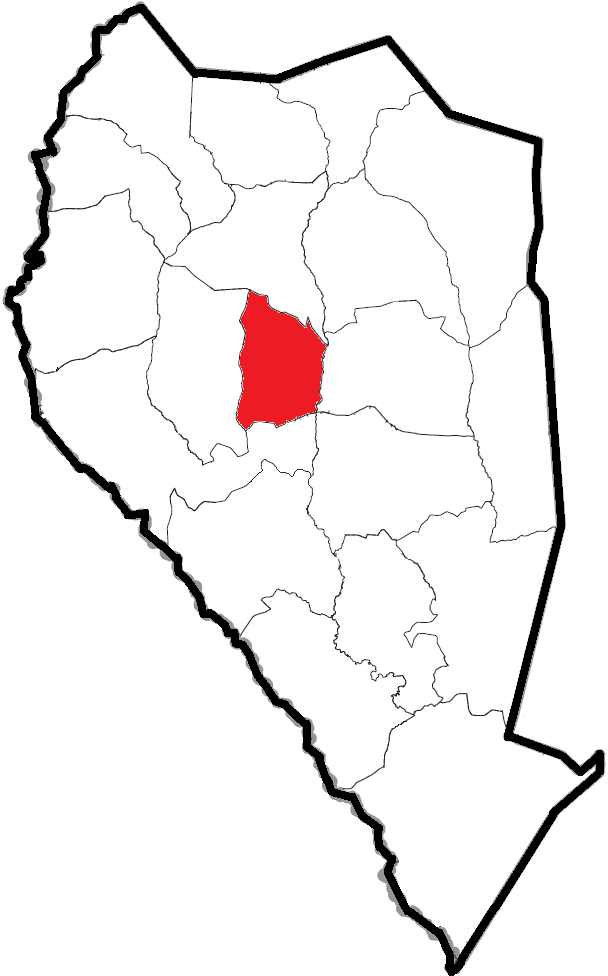
- Location of Belvoir Township within Sampson County

- Location of Sampson County within North Carolina
- Country: United States
- State: North Carolina
- County: Sampson

Area
  - Total: 26.5 sq mi (69 km^{2})

Population
  - Estimate (2022): 2,637
  - Density: 99.5/sq mi (38.4/km^{2})
- Time zone: UTC-5 (EST)
  - Summer (DST): UTC-4 (EDT)
- Area codes: 910, 472

Belvoir Township is a township in Sampson County, North Carolina, United States.

== Geography and population ==
Belvoir Township is one of 19 townships within Sampson County. It is 26.5 square miles (69 km^{2}) in total area. The township is located in central Sampson County, west of Clinton.

In 2022, the estimated population of the township was 2,637.

Communities within Belvoir Township include Bonnetsville and Reynolds Crossroads.

The township is bordered to the north by Herring Township, to the east by North Clinton Township, to the southeast by South Clinton Township, to the south by Little Coharie Township, and to the west by Honeycutt Township.

Streams within the township include Great Coharie Creek and Bearskin Swamp.

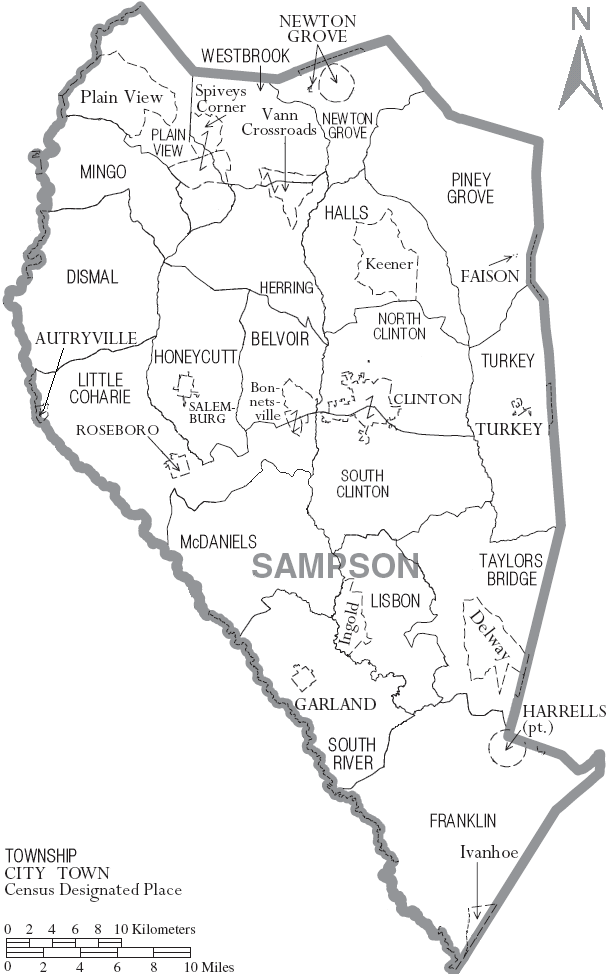
Map of Sampson County with municipal and township labels
