= CTZ =

CTZ may refer to:

- Chemoreceptor trigger zone in neuroscience
- CTZ is the ICAO airline designator for CATA Línea Aérea, Argentina
- CTZ is the IATA airport code for Sampson County Airport, United States
- CTZ is the United States Federal Aviation Administration location identifier for Sampson County Airport
- Chelyabinsk Tractor Plant, Russia
- Cyclothiazide, a positive allosteric modulator of the AMPA receptor
- Ciliary transition zone, a portion of the motility structure known as cilium present in eukaryotic cells.
- Central Time Zone
- Count trailing zeros, a computer programming bit operation
