= Plain View, Virginia =

Plain View, Virginia may refer to:

- Plain View, King and Queen County, Virginia
- Plain View, Powhatan County, Virginia
