= Rebel City, North Carolina =

Unincorporated community in North Carolina, US

Coordinates: 35°04′57″N 78°32′54″W

- Unincorporated community
- Interactive map of Rebel City, North Carolina
- Country: United States
- State: North Carolina
- County: Sampson
- Elevation: 187 ft (57 m)
- Time zone: UTC−5 (EST)
  - Summer (DST): UTC−4 (EDT)
- ZIP Code: 28385
- Area codes: 910, 472

Rebel City is an unincorporated community in Sampson County, North Carolina, United States.

== Geography ==
Rebel City is located in northwestern Sampson County, northwest of Salemburg. It is within the Dismal Township.

The ZIP Code for Rebel City is 28385.

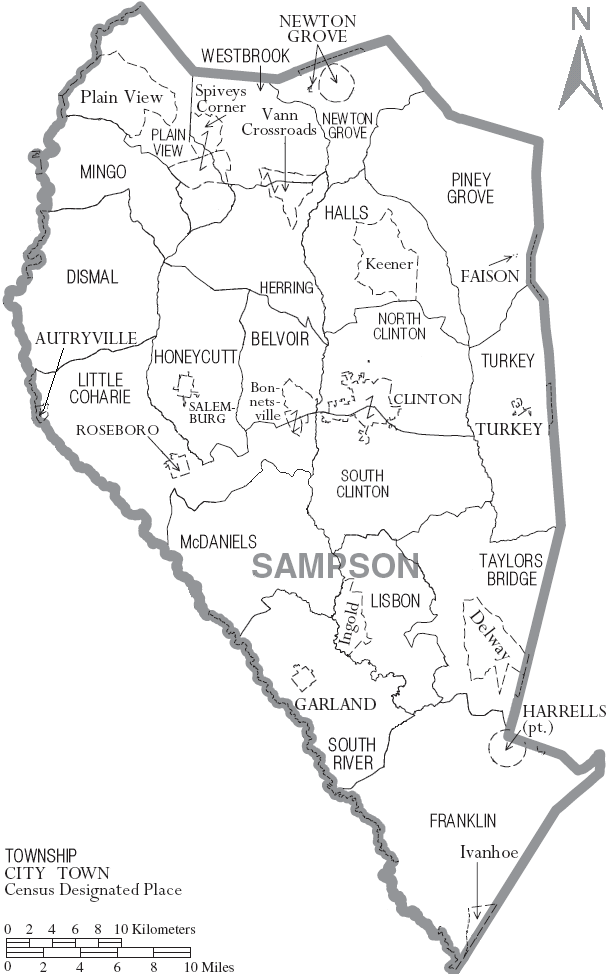
Map of Sampson County with municipal and township labels
