= Chris King (basketball) =

American basketball player (born 1969)

Personal information
- Born: July 24, 1969 (age 57) Newton Grove, North Carolina, U.S.
- Listed height: 6 ft 8 in (2.03 m)
- Listed weight: 215 lb (98 kg)

Career information
- High school: Hobbton (Newton Grove, North Carolina)
- College: Wake Forest (1988–1992)
- NBA draft: 1992: 2nd round, 45th overall pick
- Drafted by: Seattle SuperSonics
- Playing career: 1992–2008
- Position: Power forward / small forward
- Number: 35, 17, 33

Career history
- 1992–1993: Unicaja Mayoral Málaga
- 1993–1994: Seattle SuperSonics
- 1994–1995: Aris
- 1995–1996: Vancouver Grizzlies
- 1996: Polti Cantù
- 1996–1997: Baloncesto Fuenlabrada
- 1997: Gordon's Gin Boars
- 1997–1998: Rockford Lightning
- 1998: Ortaköyspor
- 1998: Rockford Lightning
- 1998–1999: La Crosse Bobcats
- 1999: Utah Jazz
- 1998–1999: Barangay Ginebra Kings
- 1999: SLUC Nancy
- 1999–2000: Paris Basket Racing
- 2000–2001: Le Mans
- 2001: Piratas de Quebradillas
- 2001–2002: Le Mans
- 2002–2003: Hapoel Tel Aviv
- 2003: Maccabi Rishon LeZion
- 2003–2004: Gary Steelheads
- 2005: Deportivo Español de Talca
- 2005: Atlético Biguá
- 2006–2007: CS Rapid București
- 2008: Link Tochigi Brex

Career highlights
- Greek League All-Star (1994 II); Greek All-Star Game Slam Dunk champion (1994 II); PBA champion (1997 Commissioners')
- Stats at NBA.com
- Stats at Basketball Reference

Christopher Donnell King (born July 24, 1969) is an American former professional basketball player. He most notably played in the National Basketball Association (NBA).

== College career ==
Born in Newton Grove, North Carolina, King got his start at playing high school basketball for the Hobbton High School Wildcats, in Newton Grove, North Carolina. He then played college basketball at Wake Forest University, where he played with the Wake Forest Demon Deacons, from 1988 to 1992.

== Professional career ==
King was selected by the Seattle SuperSonics, in 2nd round, with the 45th overall pick of 1992 NBA draft. King played in 15 games for the Sonics, during the 1993–94 season, where he made his only NBA playoff appearance. He was also a member of the Vancouver Grizzlies' inaugural season (1995–96), for whom he played in 80 out of 82 games, and starting in 66 of them. He averaged 7.9 points and 3.6 rebounds per game that season. During that season, King grabbed an NBA career-high 14 rebounds, to go along with 21 points, in a 79–94 loss to the Utah Jazz. King tipped in a Byron Scott missed shot at the buzzer, in the team's home opener, to beat the Minnesota Timberwolves in overtime. His final appearance in the league was during the 1999 lockout season, in which he played in a total of eight games with the Utah Jazz. Upon leaving the NBA, King played throughout Europe.
