= Plain View Township, Sampson County, North Carolina =

Plain View Township
- Township
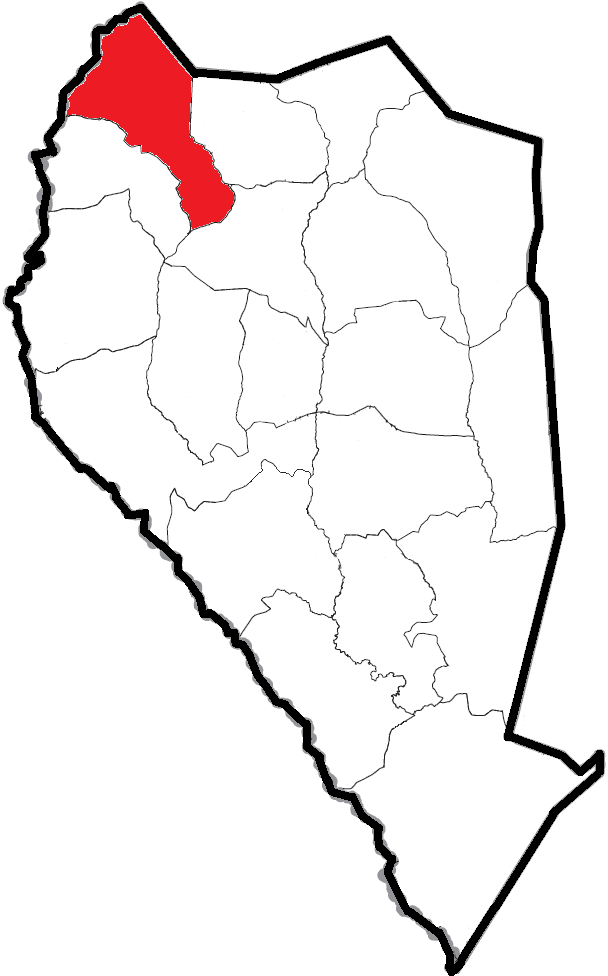
- Location of Plain View Township within Sampson County

- Location of Sampson County within North Carolina
- Country: United States
- State: North Carolina
- County: Sampson

Area
  - Total: 46.2 sq mi (120 km^{2})

Population (2020)
  - Total: 4,969
- Time zone: UTC-5 (EST)
  - Summer (DST): UTC-4 (EDT)
- Area codes: 910, 472

Plain View Township is a township in Sampson County, North Carolina, United States.

== Geography and population ==
Plain View Township is one of 19 townships within Sampson County. It is 46.2 square miles (120 km^{2}) in total area. The township is located in northwestern Sampson County, and is the northernmost township in the county.

In 2020, the population of Plain View Township was 4,969.

In 2022, the estimated population of the township was 4,165.

Communities within Plain View Township include Plain View and Spivey's Corner.

The township is bordered to the northwest by Harnett County, to the northeast by Johnston County, to the east by Westbrook Township, to the southeast by Herring Township, and to the southwest by Mingo Township.
