= Plainview Township =

Plainview Township or Plain View Township may refer to:

- Plainview Township, Phillips County, Kansas, in Phillips County, Kansas
- Plainview Township, Wabasha County, Minnesota
- Plain View Township, Sampson County, North Carolina, in Sampson County, North Carolina
- Plainview Township, Stutsman County, North Dakota, in Stutsman County, North Dakota
- Plainview Township, Tripp County, South Dakota
