= George Edwin Butler =

American lawyer and author

- Born: June 5, 1868
- Died: May 1, 1941 (aged 72)
- Occupation: Lawyer
- Writing career
- Genre: Non-fiction

George Edwin Butler (June 5, 1868 – May 1, 1941) was an American lawyer and an author of research studies and works, particularly about North Carolina. His most notable book is The Croatan Indians of Sampson County, North Carolina. Their Origin and Racial Status. A Plea for Separate Schools (1916). His older brother, Marion Butler, was elected as United States Senator from North Carolina.

== Early life ==
Butler was born in rural Sampson County, North Carolina, on his father's farm. It was located a few miles outside of the town of Roseboro. His Butler family and ancestors had lived there since the inception of the county and were yeoman farmers. He and his siblings were taught to admire knowledge. The state's public school system was started only after the Civil War and was limited in rural areas. It is not known whether Butler attended any formal school or college, but his older brother Marion Butler was a graduate of the University of North Carolina.

== Notable works and research ==
Butler wrote The Croatan Indians of Sampson County, North Carolina. Their Origin and Racial Status. A Plea for Separate Schools (1916). The state administered segregated schools for blacks and whites and had forced the Indian residents of Sampson County, who had been free before the Civil War, to attend schools with the children of freedmen. Butler supported the Indians' desire for their own schools. Many of the people who identified as Croatan Indians were mixed race; at one time whites thought that persons of mixed race could no longer be considered Indian and they emphasized classification by any African descent.

Between 1859 and 1911, the Croatan Indians of Samson County had supported "Indian Only" schools which they paid for. In 1911, the North Carolina General Assembly enacted laws providing for the financial needs of these schools, but this lasted only two years before they eliminated the funding.

The state was that the Croatan Indians tribe were considered a "mixed-race" and therefore would have to attend African-American schools. During this period of time in Sampson County, it appears as though there was a three-caste-type system in the county, with the Native Americans being given advantages of white citizens in some areas, but treated like African Americans in other areas. Based upon interviews with tribe members and elders in Butler's 1916 book, it appears that tribe members also shared in at least some of the Jim Crow law-era beliefs, as their plea to the state for funding was due to them not wanting their children to attend African-American schools. The tribe hired Butler as their attorney to fight on their behalf for the reinstatement of funds. Butler spent the next three years researching the historical documents, records, family history of the tribe members and local history, in order to gather material for his argument on behalf of the tribe.

In its final edition, Butler's book makes a case that the State of North Carolina should provide funding for the tribe to have a school district separate from the African Americans because these people appear to be European with Native-American features as well. The majority of the book discusses how these tribe members have assimilated with the local white population, and that its members have no African ancestry. The book explores the social order in which Whites had preference, Native Americans were given second place, and African Americans last. Butler unwittingly provides insight into the mindset of the Southern American culture of the early-20th century. Butler notes that in other areas of the state, comparable mixed-race Native American peoples had retained their own school district, financed by the state.

== Legacy of works ==
In 1917, the North Carolina General Assembly approved reinstatement of the law authorizing a separate schools for the Croatan Indians. The Sampson County school system continued to operate three separate school districts related to ethnicity, or race": white, black, and Indian. This did not end until after passage of civil rights legislation in 1964 and 1965 ending segregation of public facilities. During the school struggle, the Croatan Indians of Sampson County became more organized. They have been recognized as an independent tribe by the state. They do not have federal recognition.

== See also ==
- Brown v. Board of Education
- List of non-fiction writers
- List of people from North Carolina
- Lists of American writers
- Racial segregation in the United States
- Separate but equal
