= Mingo Township, Sampson County, North Carolina =

Mingo Township
- Township
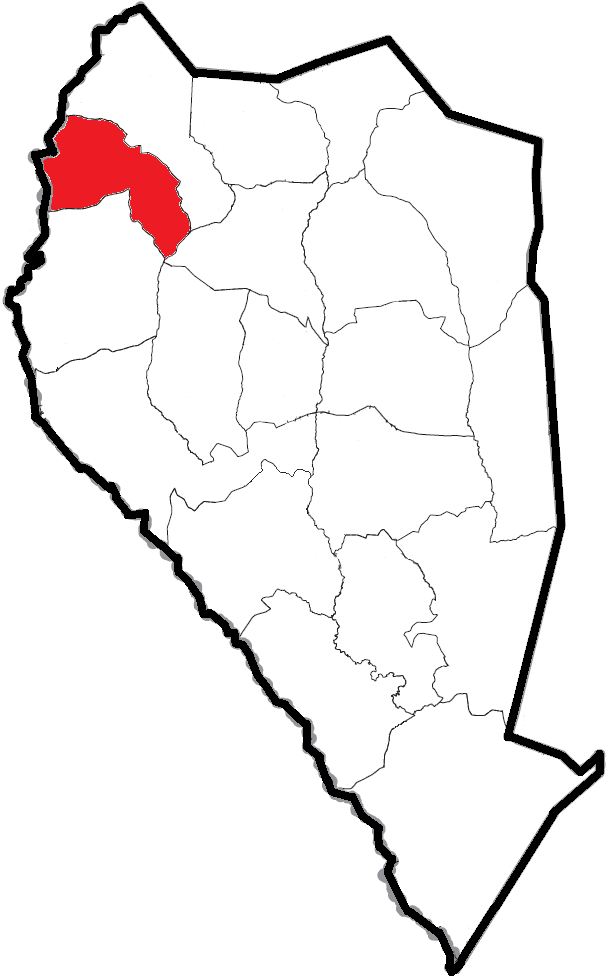
- Location of Mingo Township within Sampson County

- Location of Sampson County within North Carolina
- Country: United States
- State: North Carolina
- County: Sampson

Area
  - Total: 32.6 sq mi (84 km^{2})

Population (2020)
  - Total: 2,727
- Time zone: UTC-5 (EST)
  - Summer (DST): UTC-4 (EDT)
- Area codes: 910, 472

Mingo Township is a township in Sampson County, North Carolina, United States.

== Geography and population ==
Mingo Township is one of 19 townships within Sampson County. It is 32.6 square miles (84 km^{2}) in total area. The township is located in northwestern Sampson County.

In 2020, the population of Mingo Township was 2,727.

In 2022, the estimated population of the township was 4,314.

Communities within Mingo Township include Mingo. The primary highway in the township is U.S. Route 13, which leads west to Eastover, in adjacent Cumberland County.

Mingo Township is bordered to the north by Plain View Township, to the east by Herring Township, to the south by Dismal Township, and to the west by Cumberland County.

The South River forms a portion of the township's western border.

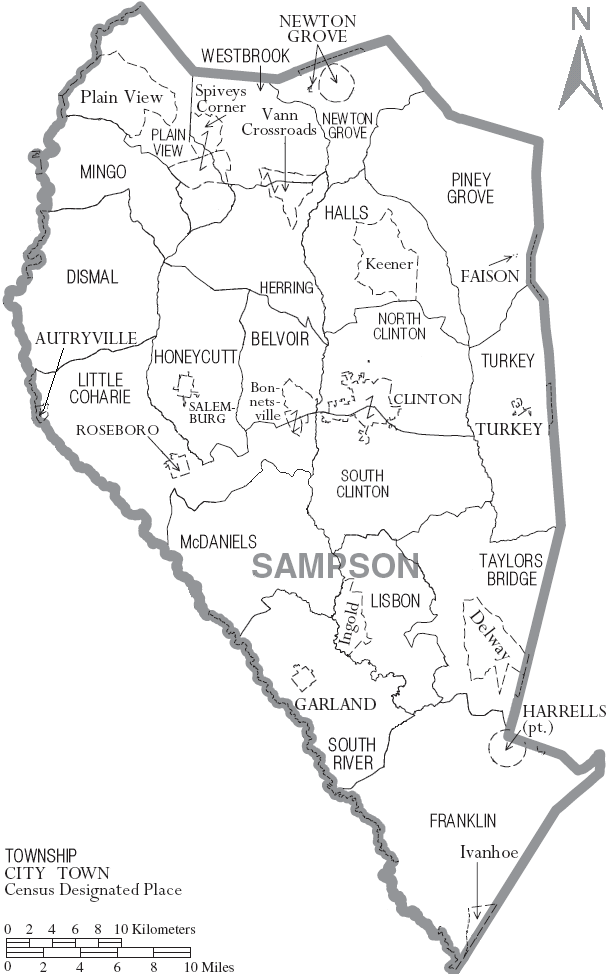
Map of Sampson County with municipal and township labels
