= Honeycutt Township, Sampson County, North Carolina =

Honeycutt Township
- Township
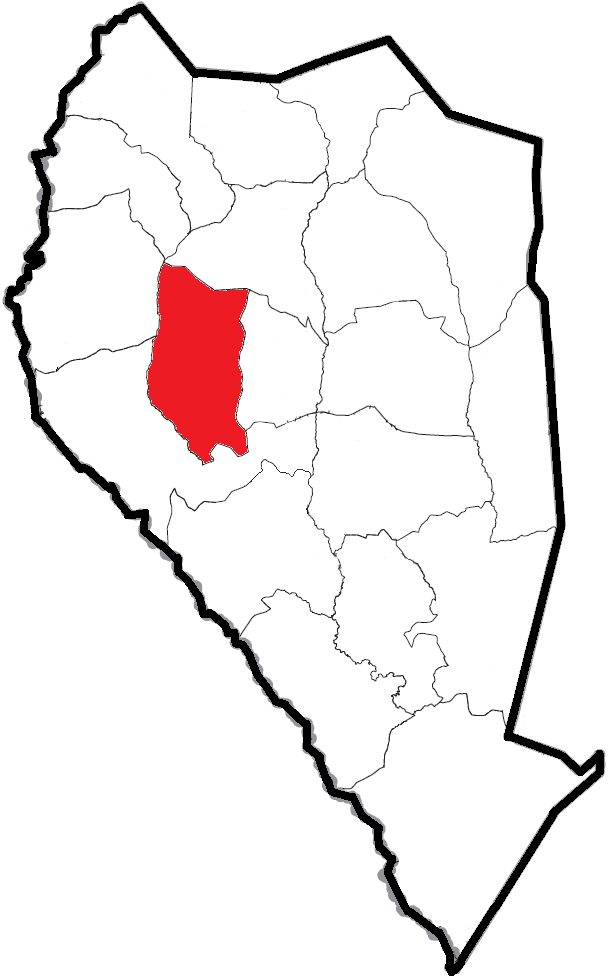
- Location of Honeycutt Township within Sampson County

- Location of Sampson County within North Carolina
- Country: United States
- State: North Carolina
- County: Sampson

Area
  - Total: 42.4 sq mi (110 km^{2})

Population (2020)
  - Total: 2,954
- Time zone: UTC-5 (EST)
  - Summer (DST): UTC-4 (EDT)
- Area codes: 910, 472

Honeycutt Township is a township in Sampson County, North Carolina, United States.

== Geography and population ==
Honeycutt Township is one of 19 townships within Sampson County. It is 42.4 square miles (110 km^{2}) in total area.

In 2020, the population of Honeycutt Township was 2,954.

Communities within the township include Piney Green, Salemburg, and Snow Hill.

Honeycutt Township is bordered to the northwest by Dismal Township, to the north by Herring Township, to the east by Belvoir Township, and to the south and west by Little Coharie Township.
