= Moltonville, North Carolina =

- Unincorporated community
- Location within North Carolina Location within the United States
- Coordinates: 34°59′28″N 78°15′02″W
- Country: United States
- State: North Carolina
- County: Sampson
- Elevation: 144 ft (44 m)
- Time zone: UTC-5 (Eastern (EST))
  - Summer (DST): UTC-4 (EDT)
- Area codes: 910, 472
- GNIS feature ID: 1025560

Moltonville (also Moultonville) is an unincorporated community in Sampson County, North Carolina, United States.
