= Dismal Township, Sampson County, North Carolina =

Township in North Carolina, US

Dismal Township
- Township
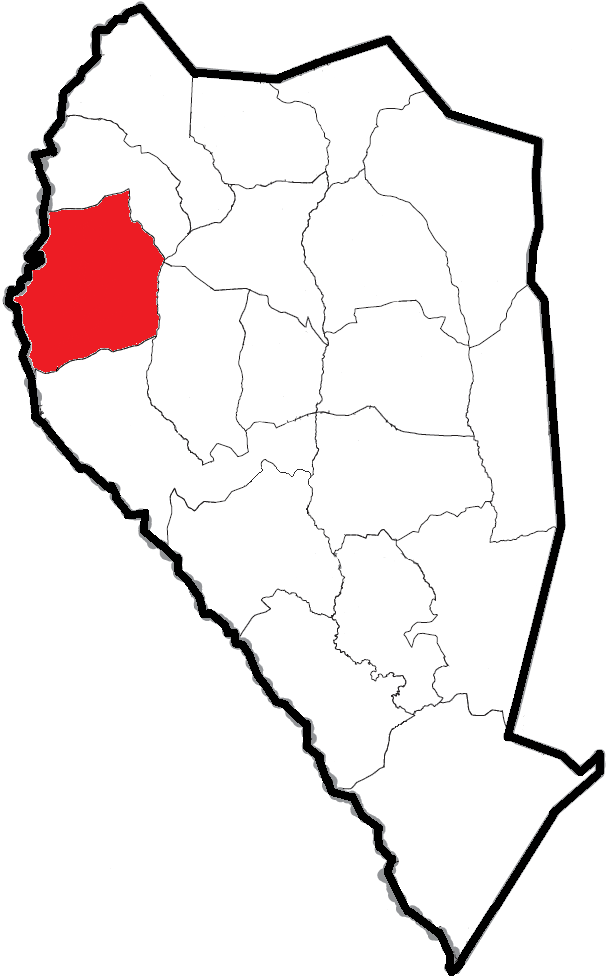
- Location of Dismal Township within Sampson County

- Location of Sampson County within North Carolina
- Country: United States
- State: North Carolina
- County: Sampson

Area
  - Total: 56.5 sq mi (146 km^{2})

Population
  - Estimate (2022): 3,380
  - Density: 59.8/sq mi (23.1/km^{2})
- Time zone: UTC-5 (EST)
  - Summer (DST): UTC-4 (EDT)
- Area codes: 910, 472

Dismal Township is a township in Sampson County, North Carolina, United States.

== Geography and population ==
Dismal Township is one of 19 townships within Sampson County. It is 56.5 square miles (146 km^{2}) in total area. The township is located in northwestern Sampson County.

In 2022, the estimated population of the township was 3,380.

Communities within Dismal Township include Clement. The primary highway in the township is U.S. Route 13, which leads west to Eastover, in adjacent Cumberland County.

The township is bordered to the north by Mingo Township, to the east by Herring Township and Honeycutt Township, to the south by Little Coharie Township, and to the west by the South River.

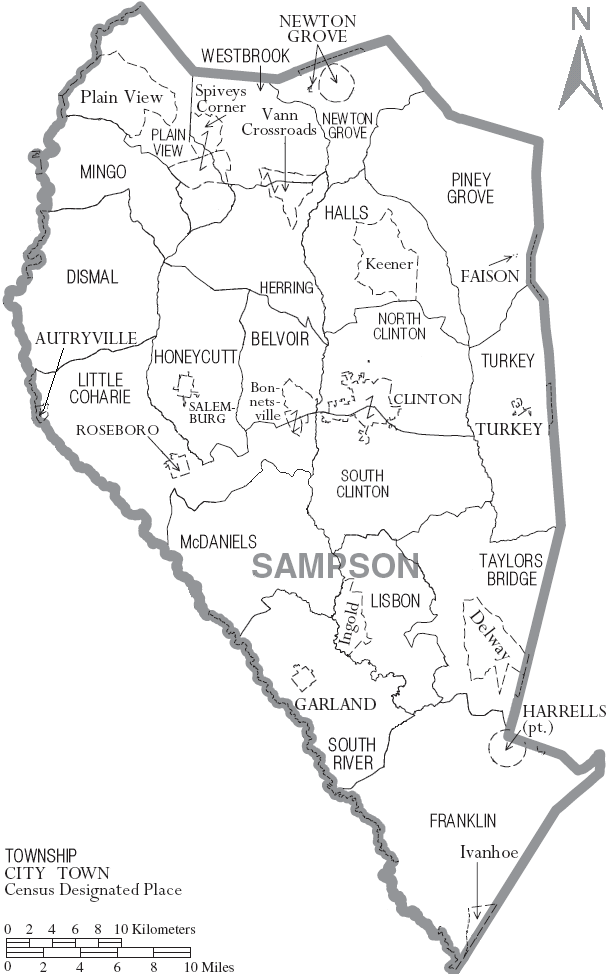
Map of Sampson County with municipal and township labels
