= Keener, North Carolina =

- CDP
- Location within the state of North Carolina
- Coordinates: 35°06′47″N 78°18′34″W
- Country: United States
- State: North Carolina
- County: Sampson

Area
  - Total: 11.18 sq mi (28.96 km^{2})
  - Land: 11.17 sq mi (28.94 km^{2})
  - Water: 0.0077 sq mi (0.02 km^{2})
- Elevation: 171 ft (52 m)

Population (2020)
  - Total: 540
  - Density: 48.3/sq mi (18.66/km^{2})
- Time zone: UTC-5 (Eastern (EST))
  - Summer (DST): UTC-4 (EDT)
- ZIP code: 28328
- Area codes: 910, 472
- FIPS code: 37-35340
- GNIS feature ID: 2403165

Keener is a census-designated place (CDP) in Sampson County, North Carolina, United States. The population was 540 at the 2020 census.

== Geography ==
According to the United States Census Bureau, the CDP has a total area of 11.2 square miles (29 km^{2}), all land.

== Demographics ==
Historical population
Census	Pop.	Note	%±
2020	540		—
U.S. Decennial Census

As of the census of 2000, there were 508 people, 206 households, and 149 families residing in the CDP. The population density was 45.5 inhabitants per square mile (17.6/km^{2}). There were 241 housing units at an average density of 21.6/sq mi (8.3/km^{2}). The racial makeup of the CDP was 71.26% White, 25.59% African American, 0.39% Native American, 2.56% from other races, and 0.20% from two or more races. Hispanic or Latino of any race were 4.53% of the population.

There were 206 households, out of which 27.7% had children under the age of 18 living with them, 53.9% were married couples living together, 14.1% had a female householder with no husband present, and 27.2% were non-families. 25.7% of all households were made up of individuals, and 15.0% had someone living alone who was 65 years of age or older. The average household size was 2.47 and the average family size was 2.93.

In the CDP, the population was spread out, with 21.5% under the age of 18, 11.4% from 18 to 24, 28.3% from 25 to 44, 25.2% from 45 to 64, and 13.6% who were 65 years of age or older. The median age was 36 years. For every 100 females, there were 88.1 males. For every 100 females age 18 and over, there were 90.9 males.

The median income for a household in the CDP was $23,125, and the median income for a family was $42,679. Males had a median income of $31,250 versus $11,534 for females. The per capita income for the CDP was $18,257. About 3.9% of families and 13.8% of the population were below the poverty line, including 17.3% of those under age 18 and 26.0% of those age 65 or over.
