= Hobbton High School =

School in North Carolina, United States

Location
- 12201 Hobbton Highway; Newton Grove, North Carolina 28336; United States
- 35°10′40″N 78°19′45″W

Information
- School type: Public
- Opened: 1957 (69 years ago)
- Superintendent: Hobbs
- CEEB code: 342915
- Principal: Michael Warren
- Teaching staff: 29.65 (FTE)
- Grades: 9–12
- Enrollment: 490 (2023-2024)
- Average class size: 18
- Student to teacher ratio: 16.53
- Colors: Black, gold, and white
- Website: www.sampson.k12.nc.us/hobbtonhigh

Hobbton High School is one of four high schools in the Sampson County School District. The high school ranges from grades 9–12 and serves students living in Newton Grove, Clinton, Turkey, and Faison.

== History ==
Hobbton High School was founded in a rural farming community in 1957. The mission of Hobbton High School is to partner with parents and the community to prepare students to become productive citizens in a changing world.

== Student population ==
Hobbton High School serves over 550 students from diverse backgrounds. In 2013, 59% of Hobbton graduates enrolled in an Institute of Higher Education which includes both two and four year colleges.

== Athletics ==
The Hobbton High School mascot is the Wildcat and Hobbton High competes in the NCHSAA 1A Division.

Fall Teams: Cross Country (Women & Men), Cheerleading, Football, Soccer (Men), Volleyball

Winter Teams: Basketball (Women & Men), Cheerleading, Indoor Track and Field (Women & Men), Swimming

Spring Teams: Baseball, Golf, Outdoor Track and Field (Women & Men), Soccer (Women), Softball

=== Cross country ===
The Hobbton men's and women's cross country teams were founded in 2012 and have grown quickly. In 2016, the Hobbton men's cross country team became the first Hobbton cross country team to qualify for the NCHSAA 1A state championships and placed 13th. Both teams are coached by Jeffrey Klaves who was a member of both the cross country and track and field teams at Campbell University.

=== Golf ===
The Hobbton Golf team was founded in 2013. The team practices at the Timberlake Golf Course in Clinton, North Carolina. In 2018, the team placed first in the Carolina 1A Conference.

=== Football ===
In 1993, the Hobbton High football team won the 1A State Championship as well a USAir Sportsmanship Award. In 2011, the team received national attention when the school board granted permission for 19-year-old Brett Bowden who has Down syndrome to participate in game day activities though he had aged out of eligibility requirements. The current coach is Joe Salas.

=== Track and field ===
Since its inception in 2011, over 200 students have participated on the winter and spring track and field teams. During this time, the team has won four county championships and 13 medals at state championships. In 2015, Hobbton High student Samson Bradsher won the NCHSAA 1A State Championship in discus and the NCHSAA 1A State Championship in shot put. In 2016, student Joshua Polk won the NCHSAA 1A State Championship in the 200 meter dash with a time of 21.82. Coach Jeffrey Klaves has won more than 10 coach-of-the-year awards for his work.

== Extracurriculars ==
=== Marching band ===
The Hobbton High Marching Band includes instrumentalists and a color guard. The band was also invited to march in Roy Cooper's Governor's Parade. Geoffrey Tart, the director of the band, was awarded the North Carolina Order of the Long Leaf Pine Award by Governor Beverly Purdue for his volunteer efforts.

=== Miss Hobbton Pageant ===
The Miss Hobbton Pageant is an annual pageant at Hobbton High School. In 2016, contestants received over $14,000 in scholarship money. The pageant is directed by Angela Martin who is a renowned vocalist and opened the world premiere of the American Idol Experience.

=== FFA Chapter ===
The Hobbton FFA Chapter is one of the largest chapters in the state. They have produced recent state officers such as Ty Meyer (2018) and Tripp Johnson (2020)

== Hobbton High News ==
=== Track and field project ===
Hobbton High School is one of seven traditional public high schools in North Carolina to have an active track team but no track and the only high school in Sampson County to not have a track. The track is anticipated to cost $650,000 but has not yet been funded by the district.

=== Flag ban ===
In 2007, Hobbton High banned students from wearing any flags in an attempt to prevent students from using foreign flags as gang symbols. The school board lifted the ban in response to the uproar.
