= Clinton–Sampson County Airport =

- IATA: CTZ; ICAO: KCTZ; FAA LID: CTZ

Summary
- Airport type: Public
- Owner: Sampson County / City of Clinton
- Serves: Clinton, North Carolina
- Elevation AMSL: 144 ft (44 m)
- Coordinates: 34°58′30″N 078°21′56″W

Map
- Location of airport in North Carolina

Runways
Direction	Length		Surface
Direction	ft	m	Surface
6/24	5,002	1,525	Asphalt

Statistics (2009)
- Aircraft operations: 5,200
- Based aircraft: 27
- Source: Federal Aviation Administration

Clinton–Sampson County Airport (IATA: CTZ, ICAO: KCTZ, FAA LID: CTZ) is a public use airport located two nautical miles (4 km) southwest of the central business district of Clinton, a city in Sampson County, North Carolina, United States. It is owned by the city and county. This airport is included in the National Plan of Integrated Airport Systems for 2011–2015, which categorized it as a general aviation facility. It was formerly known as Sampson County Airport.

== Facilities and aircraft ==
Clinton–Sampson County Airport covers an area of 114 acres (46 ha) at an elevation of 144 feet (44 m) above mean sea level. It has one runway designated 6/24 with an asphalt surface measuring 5,002 by 74 feet (1,525 x 23 m).

For the 12-month period ending September 4, 2009, the airport had 5,200 aircraft operations, an average of 14 per day: 86.5% general aviation, 11.5% military, and 2% air taxi. At that time there were 27 aircraft based at this airport: 89% single-engine, 7% jet, and 4% multi-engine.

== See also ==
- List of airports in North Carolina
