= Marion Butler =

American politician, senator (1863–1938)

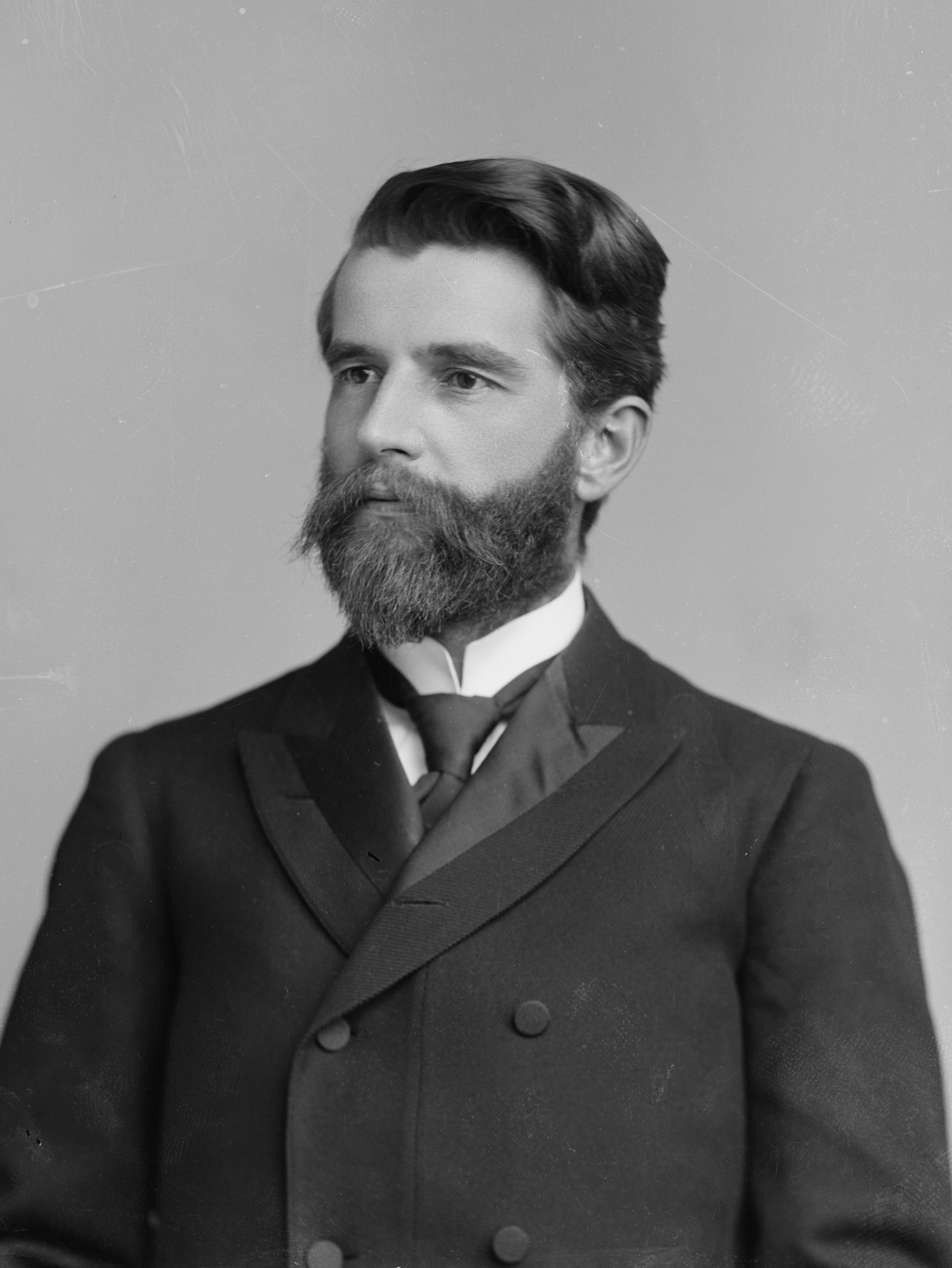
- Portrait by C. M. Bell c. 1895–1896

United States Senator from North Carolina
- In office March 4, 1895 – March 4, 1901
- Preceded by: Matt W. Ransom
- Succeeded by: Furnifold M. Simmons

Member of the North Carolina Senate from the 14th district
- In office 1891–1893
- Preceded by: Edwin W. Kerr
- Succeeded by: W. H. G. Lucas; F. R. Cooper

Personal details
- Born: May 20, 1863 Sampson County, North Carolina
- Died: June 3, 1938 (aged 75) Takoma Park, Maryland
- Party: Populist
- Other political affiliations: Democratic; Republican
- Spouse: Florence Faison Butler
- Education: University of North Carolina
- Profession: Politician, Farmer, Lawyer, Editor, Publisher

Marion Butler (May 20, 1863 – June 3, 1938) was an American politician, farmer, and lawyer. He represented North Carolina in the United States Senate for one term, serving between 1895 and 1901. At the time, he was a leader of the North Carolina Populist Party, and also affiliated with the Democratic Party and the Republican Party at different points in his career. He was the older brother of George Edwin Butler.

Born in Sampson County, North Carolina, Butler took over his family's farm after graduating from the University of North Carolina. He became a leader of the Farmers' Alliance and won election to the North Carolina Senate as a member of the Democratic Party. During the 1892 election, he led a group of North Carolina Democrats opposed to Grover Cleveland into the Populist Party. As a leader of the Populists, Butler advocated "Fusion" with the Republican Party, and the Populists and Republicans together won control of the state legislature in the 1894 elections. The new legislature elected Butler to the United States Senate.

In the Senate, Butler advocated for Populist reforms like the institution of bimetallism and the nationalization of railroads. In the 1896 presidential election, Butler helped orchestrate a compromise with the national Democratic Party whereby both parties nominated William Jennings Bryan. Butler stood for re-election in 1900, but Democrats had regained control of the state legislature and he was defeated. After his defeat, Butler practiced law in Washington, D.C. He died in 1938 in Takoma Park, Maryland, a nearby suburb.

== Early life ==
Butler was born in 1863 in rural Sampson County, North Carolina during the American Civil War. His parents were yeomen farmers. It is unknown if he attended any of the new public schools established after the war, but he was a graduate of the University of North Carolina. There he was a member of the Dialectic Society. His planned to practice law, but his father's death required Butler to take responsibility for managing the family farm, rather than attending law school.

== Farmers' Alliance and Populism ==
When the Farmers' Alliance movement spread from the Southwest into North Carolina in the late 1880s, Butler immediately joined the organization. It provided him a ladder of political opportunity that he climbed with impressive speed. As the son of yeoman farmers, Butler grew up in a strong agrarian tradition. Possessing the formal education and experiences from his years at the University of North Carolina, Butler stood out from his fellow farmers. By the age of 25, he was elected President of the local Farmers' Alliance and in 1893 was elected President of the National Farmer's Alliance.

Still a Democrat at this time, Butler was elected to the North Carolina Senate as an "Alliance Democrat" in 1890. In 1891, at age 28, he was elected President of the State Farmers' Alliance. Due to a general distaste for Democratic nominee Grover Cleveland, and the North Carolina Democratic Party's ruling that no voter could vote on a "split ticket", Butler led a mass exodus of Alliance members and followers from the Democratic party which had ruled the state since Reconstruction, to the Populist, or "People's Party" in 1892.

During his tenure with the Populists, Butler was an advocate of "Fusion", meaning outright cooperation with the North Carolina Republican Party as a means to achieve some of the more important goals of his party. While some Populists disliked what they saw as a compromise made on some of their core beliefs, Butler saw short-term success. Together the Populists and Republicans polled a larger vote than the Democrats in the election of 1892; their Fusion candidates swept both houses of the legislature in the Election of 1894.

== Senate career ==
In 1894, Butler was elected as United States Senator from North Carolina, serving alongside Senator Jeter C. Pritchard. As a United States Senator, Butler continued to advocate for workable reforms from the Populist Party Platform, including the regulation or outright ownership by the United States Government of railroads and telegraphs, as well as for a silver-based currency system.

Butler obtained national prominence in the 1896 United States presidential election when he orchestrated a compromise between Democrats and Populists. Populists endorsed Democratic nominee William Jennings Bryan on a ticket with Populist vice-presidential nominee Thomas E. Watson. This was another example of "fusion" under Butler. Ironically, this national Populist-Democrat cooperation coincided with the Populist-Republican cooperation in North Carolina. After Bryan's loss, Butler continued to work for reform on the national stage which would benefit farmers, but this work would soon be cut short by the "white supremacy" campaigns of the Democratic Party in North Carolina. Butler lost his bid for re-election in 1900, however he would remain the national chairman of the People's Party until 1904 when he would officially become a Republican. Butler joined the Progressive Republican Faction of the National Republican Party alongside notable individuals such as Theodore Roosevelt.

== Post–Senate career ==
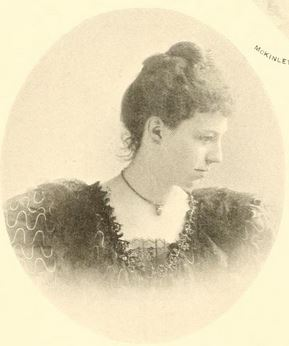
Florence Faison

During his time as Senator, Butler received his law degree from the University of North Carolina, and after his electoral defeat in 1904, practiced law in Washington, D.C.

He married Florence Faison of Sampson County on August 31, 1893, and they had five children: Pocahontas, Marion, Edward F., Florence F., and Wiley. The former Senator died in Takoma Park, Maryland in 1938, and was buried at Saint Paul's Episcopal Church in Clinton, North Carolina. A portrait of Marion Butler during his time in the U.S. Senate is included in the collection of the Dialectic and Philanthropic Societies in their chambers on the campus of the University of North Carolina at Chapel Hill, North Carolina.

== Legacy ==
Butler's legacy is surrounded by considerable debate among scholars of the era. Progressive historians, who tend to look favorably on the goals of the Populist Movement in general have often discarded Butler's fusionism, silver-backed currency and emphasis on white supremacy as being "un-Populist". In refuting this analysis, some historians point to Butler's immense popularity among Populist adherents, and to the fact that Butler held at different times the Presidency of the National Farmers' Alliance and was Chairman of the Populist Party itself.

Regardless of the classification of Butler's beliefs and actions, it is undisputed that his actions and rhetoric were extremely influential in the North Carolina and national Populist movement, especially after the death of Leonidas L. Polk, the movement's elder statesman, in 1892.

The Marion Butler Birthplace was added to the National Register of Historic Places in 1986.

He is the last U.S. Senator to have served during the presidency of Grover Cleveland.

== Footnotes ==
U.S. Senate
Preceded by Matt W. Ransom	U.S. senator (Class 1) from North Carolina; March 4, 1895 – March 4, 1901; Served alongside: Jeter C. Pritchard	Succeeded by Furnifold M. Simmons
Honorary titles
Preceded by Lee Mantle	Most senior living U.S. senator (Sitting or former); November 18, 1934 – June 3, 1938	Succeeded by Henry Heitfeld
