= Plain View, North Carolina =

Plain View
- CDP
- Location within the state of North Carolina
- Coordinates: 35°14′45″N 78°33′48″W
- Country: United States
- State: North Carolina
- County: Sampson

Area
  - Total: 16.69 sq mi (43.22 km^{2})
  - Land: 16.65 sq mi (43.13 km^{2})
  - Water: 0.035 sq mi (0.09 km^{2})
- Elevation: 197 ft (60 m)

Population (2020)
  - Total: 1,923
  - Density: 115.5/sq mi (44.59/km^{2})
- Time zone: UTC-5 (Eastern (EST))
  - Summer (DST): UTC-4 (EDT)
- ZIP code: 28334
- Area codes: 910, 472
- FIPS code: 37-52685
- GNIS feature ID: 2403426

Plain View is a census-designated place (CDP) in Sampson County, North Carolina, United States. The population was 1,923 at the 2020 census.

== Geography ==
According to the United States Census Bureau, the CDP has a total area of 16.7 square miles (43 km^{2}), of which 16.6 square miles (43.0 km^{2}) is land and 0.1 square miles (0.26 km^{2}) (0.36%) is water.

== Demographics ==
Historical population
Census	Pop.	Note	%±
2020	1,923		—
U.S. Decennial Census

As of the census of 2000, there were 1,820 people, 680 households, and 505 families residing in the CDP. The population density was 109.6 people per square mile (42.3 people/km^{2}). There were 732 housing units at an average density of 44.1 per square mile (17.0/km^{2}). The racial makeup of the CDP was 84.84% White, 11.59% African American, 1.04% Native American, 0.05% Asian, 1.59% from other races, and 0.88% from two or more races. Hispanic or Latino of any race were 3.02% of the population.

There were 680 households, out of which 38.4% had children under the age of 18 living with them, 60.6% were married couples living together, 9.7% had a female householder with no husband present, and 25.6% were non-families. 21.3% of all households were made up of individuals, and 7.9% had someone living alone who was 65 years of age or older. The average household size was 2.68 and the average family size was 3.10.

In the CDP, the population was spread out, with 27.3% under the age of 18, 7.9% from 18 to 24, 31.8% from 25 to 44, 23.8% from 45 to 64, and 9.2% who were 65 years of age or older. The median age was 34 years. For every 100 females, there were 102.7 males. For every 100 females age 18 and over, there were 100.3 males.

The median income for a household in the CDP was $31,797, and the median income for a family was $38,750. Males had a median income of $27,500 versus $18,125 for females. The per capita income for the CDP was $15,011. About 10.3% of families and 15.7% of the population were below the poverty line, including 29.7% of those under age 18 and 11.8% of those age 65 or over.
