= Plain View, King and Queen County, Virginia =

Unincorporated community in Virginia, United States

Plain View, Virginia
- Unincorporated community
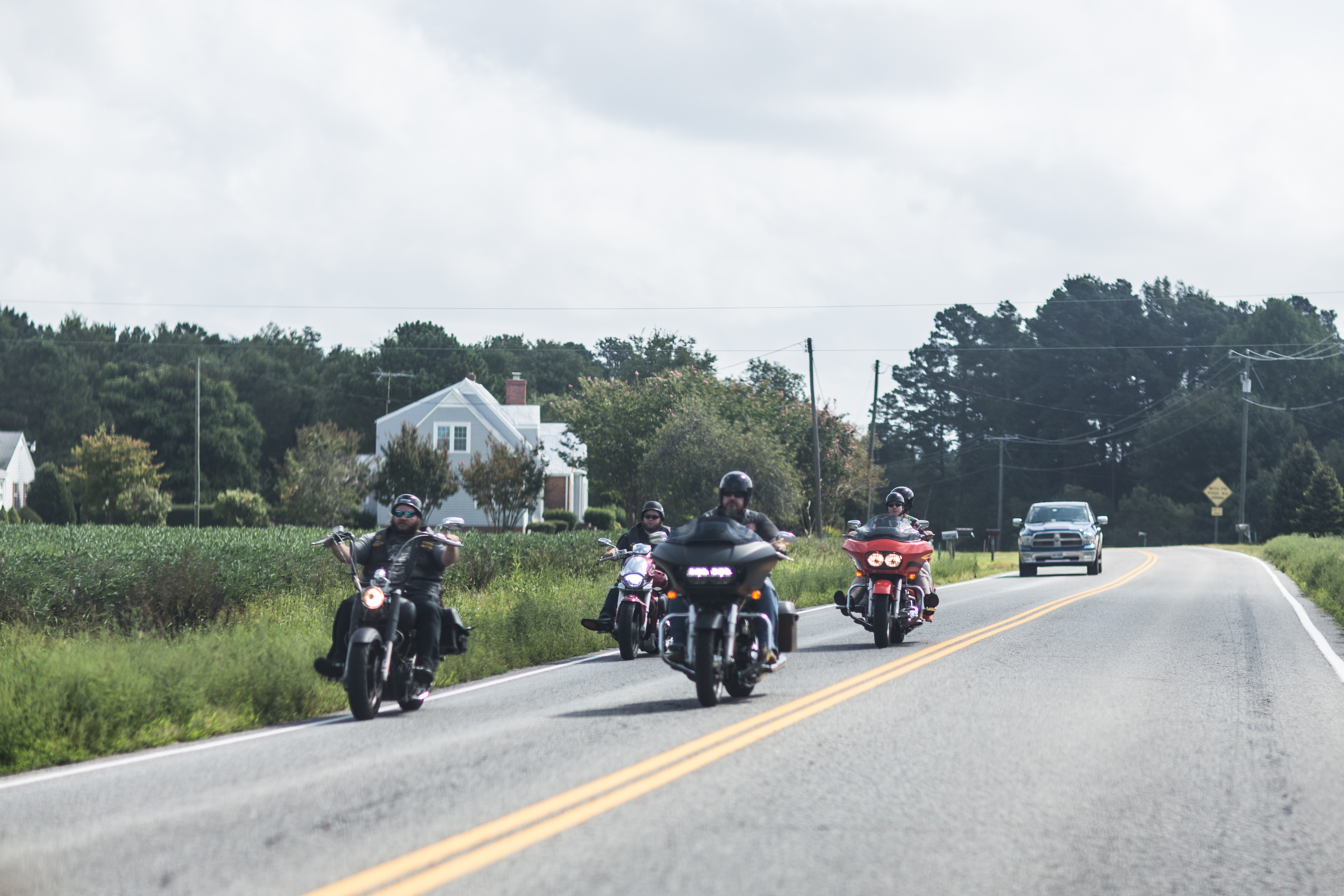

- Location within the Commonwealth of Virginia Plain View (the United States)
- Coordinates: 37°29′46″N 76°40′4″W
- Country: United States
- State: Virginia
- County: King and Queen
- Time zone: UTC−5 (Eastern (EST))
  - Summer (DST): UTC−4 (EDT)

Plain View is an unincorporated community in King and Queen County, Virginia, United States.
