= Vann Crossroads, North Carolina =

- CDP
- Location within the state of North Carolina
- Coordinates: 35°10′11″N 78°24′10″W
- Country: United States
- State: North Carolina
- County: Sampson

Area
  - Total: 4.57 sq mi (11.83 km^{2})
  - Land: 4.56 sq mi (11.81 km^{2})
  - Water: 0.0077 sq mi (0.02 km^{2})
- Elevation: 184 ft (56 m)

Population (2020)
  - Total: 306
  - Density: 67.1/sq mi (25.91/km^{2})
- Time zone: UTC-5 (Eastern (EST))
  - Summer (DST): UTC-4 (EDT)
- FIPS code: 37-69755
- GNIS feature ID: 2402963

Vann Crossroads is a census-designated place (CDP) in Sampson County, North Carolina, United States. The population was 306 at the 2020 census.

== Geography ==
According to the United States Census Bureau, the CDP has a total area of 4.6 square miles (12 km^{2}), of which 4.6 square miles (11.9 km^{2}) is land and 0.22% is water.

== Demographics ==
Historical population
Census	Pop.	Note	%±
2020	306		—
U.S. Decennial Census

As of the census of 2000, there were 324 people, 127 households, and 100 families residing in the CDP. The population density was 70.7 inhabitants per square mile (27.3/km^{2}). There were 141 housing units at an average density of 30.8 per square mile (11.9/km^{2}). The racial makeup of the CDP was 87.96% White, 11.11% African American and 0.93% Native American. Hispanic or Latino of any race were 0.62% of the population.

There were 127 households, out of which 31.5% had children under the age of 18 living with them, 66.1% were married couples living together, 10.2% had a female householder with no husband present, and 20.5% were non-families. 16.5% of all households were made up of individuals, and 9.4% had someone living alone who was 65 years of age or older. The average household size was 2.55 and the average family size was 2.86.

In the CDP, the population was spread out, with 23.8% under the age of 18, 5.6% from 18 to 24, 25.6% from 25 to 44, 27.5% from 45 to 64, and 17.6% who were 65 years of age or older. The median age was 41 years. For every 100 females, there were 94.0 males. For every 100 females age 18 and over, there were 93.0 males.

The median income for a household in the CDP was $32,443, and the median income for a family was $38,036. Males had a median income of $27,000 versus $22,426 for females. The per capita income for the CDP was $16,881. About 6.1% of families and 8.4% of the population were below the poverty line, including 13.2% of those under age 18 and 7.9% of those age 65 or over.
