= Spivey's Corner, North Carolina =

Spiveys Corner, North Carolina
- CDP
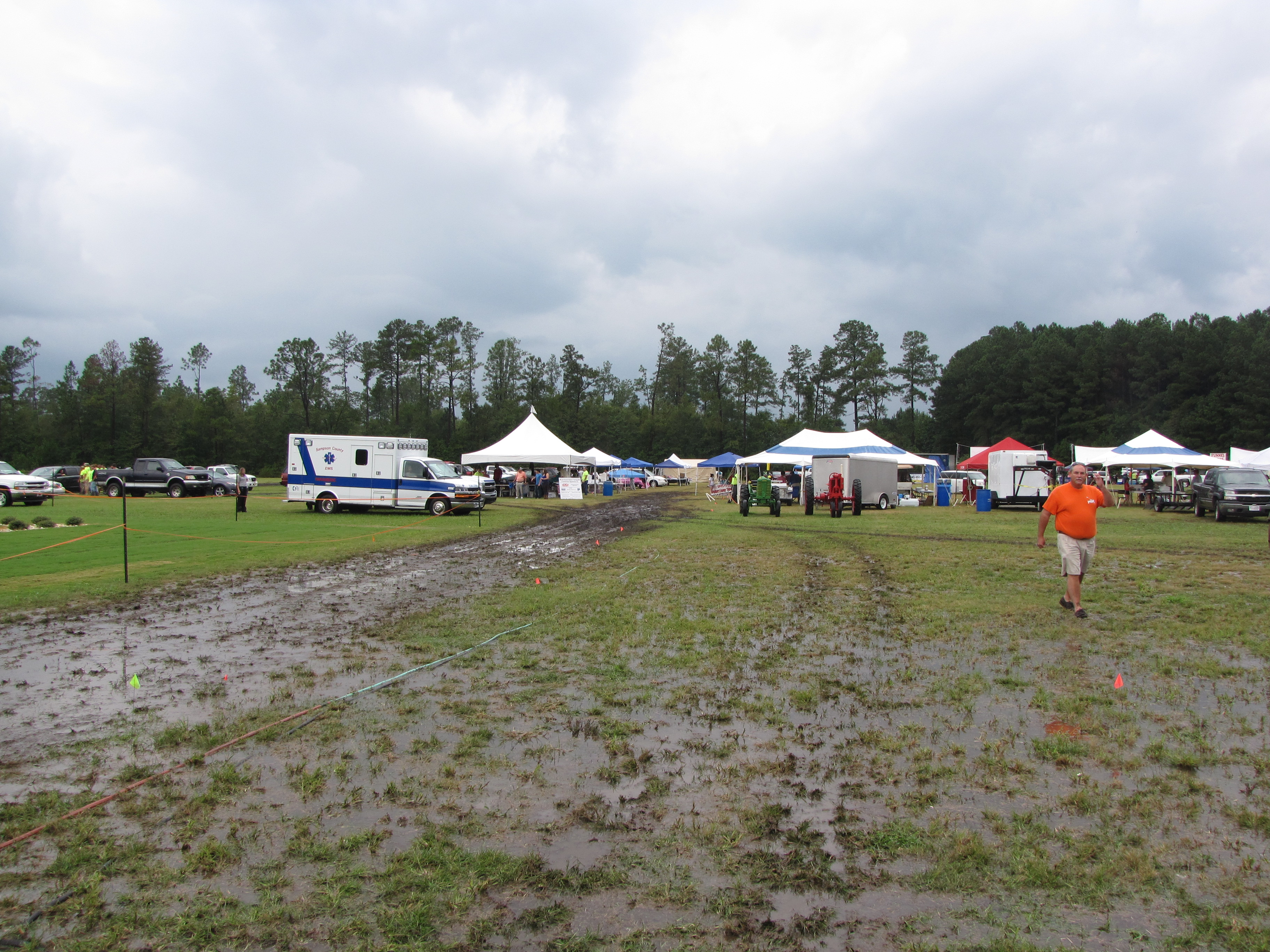
- The National Hollerin' Contest

- Location within the state of North Carolina
- Coordinates: 35°11′53″N 78°28′57″W
- Country: United States
- State: North Carolina
- County: Sampson

Area
  - Total: 7.77 sq mi (20.13 km^{2})
  - Land: 7.77 sq mi (20.13 km^{2})
  - Water: 0 sq mi (0.00 km^{2})
- Elevation: 190 ft (58 m)

Population (2020)
  - Total: 576
  - Density: 74.1/sq mi (28.62/km^{2})
- Time zone: UTC-5 (Eastern (EST))
  - Summer (DST): UTC-4 (EDT)
- FIPS code: 37-63920
- GNIS feature ID: 2402887

Spivey's Corner (/ˈspaɪvis/ SPY-vees) is a census-designated place located in Sampson County, North Carolina, United States, at the intersection of U.S. Highway 13 and U.S. Highway 421. At the 2020 census, the CDP had a total population of 576.

From 1969 to 2015, Spivey's Corner was the home of the National Hollerin' Contest. Contestants from the contest have appeared on Johnny Carson's The Tonight Show and the Late Show with David Letterman.

== Geography ==
According to the United States Census Bureau, the CDP has a total area of 7.8 square miles (20 km^{2}), all land.

== Demographics ==
Historical population
Census	Pop.	Note	%±
2020	576		—
U.S. Decennial Census

As of the 2000 United States census, there were 448 people in the town, organized into 149 households and 119 families. The population density was 57.8 inhabitants per square mile (22.3/km^{2}). There were 178 housing units at an average density of 23.0/sq mi (8.9/km^{2}). The racial makeup of the CDP was 58.48% White, 37.95% African American, 0.22% Native American, 0.00% Asian, 0.00% Pacific Islander, 3.35% from other races, and 0.00% from two or more races. 5.58% of the population were Hispanic or Latino of any race.

There were 149 households, out of which 41.6% had children under the age of 18 living with them, 61.1% were married couples living together, 13.4% had a female householder with no husband present, and 20.1% were non-families. 14.1% of all households were made up of individuals, and 7.4% had someone living alone who was 65 years of age or older. The average household size was 3.01 and the average family size was 3.31.

In the CDP, the population was spread out, with 29.9% under the age of 18, 6.9% from 18 to 24, 33.9% from 25 to 44, 21.9% from 45 to 64, and 7.4% who were 65 years of age or older. The median age was 34 years. For every 100 females, there were 92.3 males. For every 100 females age 18 and over, there were 85.8 males.

The median income for a household in the CDP was $47,000, and the median income for a family was $48,542. Males had a median income of $36,250 versus $24,643 for females. The per capita income for the CDP was $16,371. 25.4% of the population and 21.1% of families were below the poverty line. Out of the total population, 32.2% of those under the age of 18 and 23.8% of those 65 and older were living below the poverty line.

== Culture ==
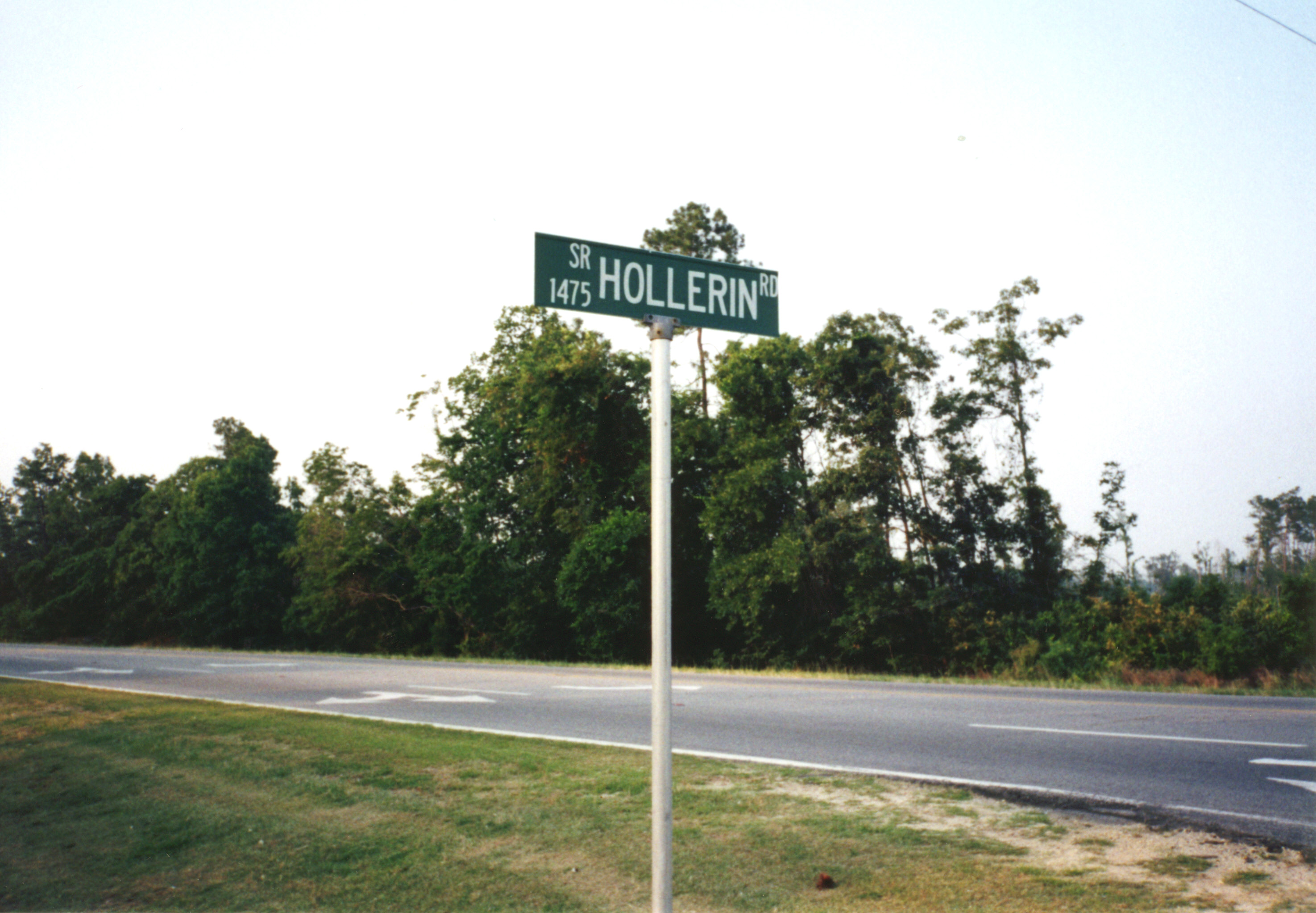
Hollerin Road street sign in Spivey's Corner

The National Hollerin' Contest, first held in 1969, was an annual competition held in Spivey's Corner. It continued for nearly 50 years, before ending in 2015.

The contest, held on the first Saturday in September, was inaugurated in order to revive the almost-lost art of "hollerin", a sophisticated vocal tradition that served as a means of long-distance communication between individuals as well as an amusing form of entertainment, before the widespread adoption of the telephone. From 1969 until 2012, the contest was held on the third Saturday of June, with it changing to September beginning in 2013. The final contest was held in 2015.
