= Bonnetsville, North Carolina =

- CDP
- Location within the state of North Carolina
- Coordinates: 34°59′57″N 78°23′46″W
- Country: United States
- State: North Carolina
- County: Sampson

Area
  - Total: 3.31 sq mi (8.58 km^{2})
  - Land: 3.31 sq mi (8.56 km^{2})
  - Water: 0.0039 sq mi (0.01 km^{2})
- Elevation: 161 ft (49 m)

Population (2020)
  - Total: 318
  - Density: 96.2/sq mi (37.14/km^{2})
- Time zone: UTC-5 (Eastern (EST))
  - Summer (DST): UTC-4 (EDT)
- FIPS code: 37-06980
- GNIS feature ID: 2402703

Bonnetsville is a census-designated place (CDP) in Sampson County, North Carolina, United States. The population was 318 at the 2020 census.

== Geography ==
According to the United States Census Bureau, the CDP has a total area of 3.3 square miles (8.5 km^{2}), of which 3.3 square miles (8.5 km^{2}) is land and 0.31% is water.

== Demographics ==
Historical population
Census	Pop.	Note	%±
2020	318		—
U.S. Decennial Census

As of the census of 2000, there were 390 people, 148 households, and 108 families residing in the CDP. The population density was 119.4 people per square mile (46.1 people/km^{2}). There were 183 housing units at an average density of 56.0 per square mile (21.6/km^{2}). The racial makeup of the CDP was 55.13% White, 34.87% African American, 1.03% Native American, 5.64% from other races, and 3.33% from two or more races. Hispanic or Latino of any race were 12.56% of the population.

There were 148 households, out of which 31.8% had children under the age of 18 living with them, 52.7% were married couples living together, 14.2% had a female householder with no husband present, and 27.0% were non-families. 20.9% of all households were made up of individuals, and 5.4% had someone living alone who was 65 years of age or older. The average household size was 2.64 and the average family size was 3.06.

In the CDP, the population was spread out, with 25.9% under the age of 18, 9.0% from 18 to 24, 31.8% from 25 to 44, 25.4% from 45 to 64, and 7.9% who were 65 years of age or older. The median age was 35 years. For every 100 females, there were 98.0 males. For every 100 females age 18 and over, there were 99.3 males.

The median income for a household in the CDP was $35,125, and the median income for a family was $39,531. Males had a median income of $28,125 versus $16,500 for females. The per capita income for the CDP was $12,793. About 11.7% of families and 13.0% of the population were below the poverty line, including 20.6% of those under age 18 and none of those age 65 or over.
