= Sampson County, North Carolina =

County in North Carolina, United States

- County
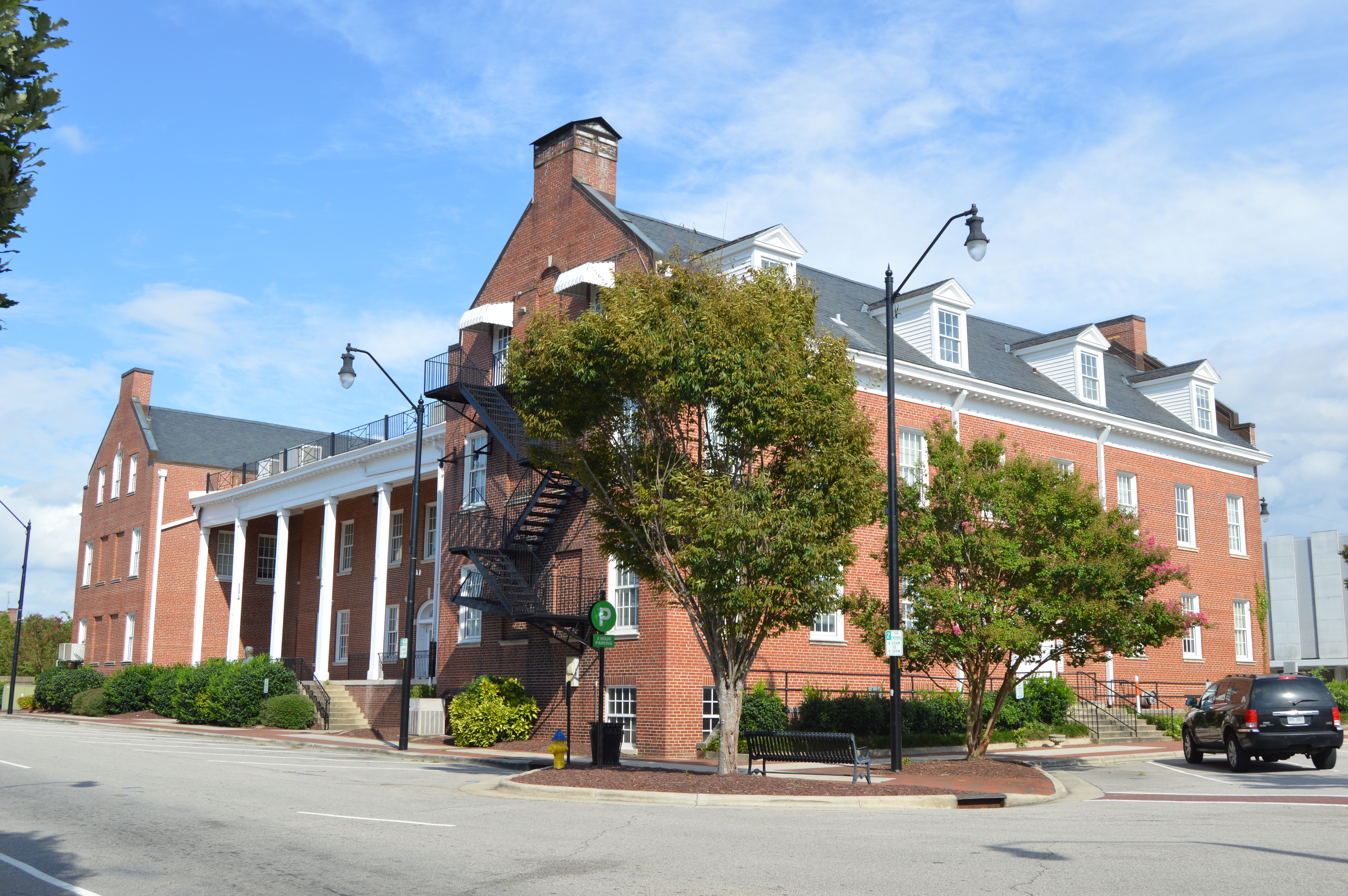
- Sampson County Courthouse in Clinton

- Seal Logo

- Location within the U.S. state of North Carolina
- Coordinates: 34.99°N 78.37°W
- Country: United States
- State: North Carolina
- Founded: 1784
- Named for: John Sampson
- Seat: Clinton
- Largest community: Clinton

Area
  - Total: 947.83 sq mi (2,454.9 km^{2})
  - Land: 945.93 sq mi (2,449.9 km^{2})
  - Water: 1.90 sq mi (4.9 km^{2}) 0.20%

Population (2020)
  - Total: 59,036
  - Estimate (2025): 61,504 ▲
  - Density: 62.41/sq mi (24.10/km^{2})
- Time zone: UTC−5 (Eastern)
  - Summer (DST): UTC−4 (EDT)
- Congressional districts: 3rd, 7th
- Website: www.sampsoncountync.gov

Sampson County is a county located in the U.S. state of North Carolina. The population was 59,036 at the 2020 census. Its county seat is Clinton.

== History ==
Sampson County was established in April 1784 following the American Revolutionary War. The North Carolina General Assembly annexed land from the neighboring Duplin County. The neighboring counties of Wayne and New Hanover would be annexed later.

Early settlers were Scots-Irish immigrants from Northern Ireland, many came to colonial North Carolina under the protection and inducements of Henry McCulloch, a wealthy London merchant. The community of Taylors Bridge was one of the earliest European settled areas of the county. Pioneer families lived there as early as the 1730s or 1740s. The first settlers of the area were Edmond Matthis, William Johnson, William Robinson and John Register, followed by members of the Peterson, Knowles, Vann, Boney, Merritt, Pearson, Powell, Herring, Rogers, Bryant, Blue, Ezzell, James Murphy, Ward, Sellers, Parrish, Fryar, Williamson and Bass families. In 1745, McCulloch obtained grants from the British Crown covering some 71,160 acres of land "lying and situated on the branches of the North East and Black River." The Scot-Irish immigrants were soon joined by descendants of the Swiss colony in New Bern. Later on, they were joined by pioneers from the northern states of New Jersey, Connecticut and Massachusetts.

Among the first European settlers of the area was John Sampson. Sampson was appointed as the first Register of Deeds for Duplin County. He served as a Lt. Colonel, and then a Lt. General in the county's militia, and was later elected as the first mayor of Wilmington. Sampson brought with him Richard Clinton, believed to be his stepson.

As an adult, Clinton soon distinguished himself in governmental and military service, serving as Duplin County's Register of Deeds for ten years. He was elected to the Provincial Congress held at Hillsboro. In 1776, at the outbreak of the Revolution, Clinton organized a company of militia from upper Duplin County and led them as captain in the defense of Wilmington against the British. He was later appointed Colonel of Cavalry and Brigadier General of the Fayetteville District. Upon the establishment of the state government of North Carolina by the Halifax Constitution of 1776, Clinton was elected as one of the first members of the House of Commons, representing the County of Duplin as a House member. Clinton continued as a representative of Duplin County until the creation of Sampson County in 1784. Clinton secured passage of the act creating the new county, and proposed the name "Sampson" in honor of John Sampson, his stepfather and benefactor.

According to the 2000 census, there were 1,029 members of the state-recognized Coharie Intra-tribal Council, Inc., a state-recognized tribe in Sampson County, who claim "descent from certain tribes of Indians originally inhabiting the coastal regions of North Carolina."

George Edwin Butler, author of The Croatan Indians of Sampson County, North Carolina. Their Origin and Racial Status. A Plea for Separate Schools (1916), claimed that the Croatan were mixed-race descendants of English settlers on the Lost Colony of Roanoke Island. The persons associated as Croatan were variously classified as "White", "Mulatto", "Colored", and "Negro" in the censuses of the 19th century. There was no category for Indian.

But most historians do not believe the story of the Croatan Indians in North Carolina. No records exist of any English settlement inland of the North Carolina coast prior to 1703, when John Lawson explored the inner region of the territory. Butler claimed that Lawson had come across Native Americans who were tilling the land in the English style, speaking an antiquated English, having gray and blue eyes, and wanting Lawson to teach them how to "speak from a book" as their forefathers did. Mainline historians have found no evidence that any Europeans survived from Roanoke Island. DNA analysis of the "Indians" of Sampson County have not supported such early 20th c. origins.

== Geography ==
Interactive map of Sampson County

According to the U.S. Census Bureau, the county has a total area of 947.83 square miles (2,454.9 km^{2}), of which 945.93 square miles (2,449.9 km^{2}) is land and 1.90 square miles (4.9 km^{2}) (0.20%) is water. It is the second-largest county by land area, behind only Robeson County, which has a land area of 949.26 square miles (2,458.6 km^{2}).

The county is in the watersheds of the Black and South Rivers and Six Run Creek.

=== State and local protected areas ===
- Sampson Game Land

=== Major water bodies ===
- Black River, home of the oldest documented Taxodium distichum (bald cypress) at 2,651 years old; located in Bladen County
- Bulltail Creek
- Great Coharie Creek
- Little Coharie Creek
- Mingo Swamp
- Six Run Creek
- South River

=== Adjacent counties ===
- Johnston County – north
- Wayne County – northeast
- Duplin County – east
- Pender County – southeast
- Bladen County – southwest
- Cumberland County – west
- Harnett County – northwest

=== Major highways ===
- I-40
- Future I-795
- US 13
- US 117 Conn.
- US 421
- US 701
- NC 24
- NC 24 Bus. (business route)
- NC 41
- NC 50
- NC 55
- NC 96
- NC 242
- NC 403
- NC 411
- NC 903

=== Major infrastructure ===
- Clinton-Sampson County Airport, public use airport located two nautical miles (4 km) southwest of the central business district of Clinton, a city in Sampson County, North Carolina, United States. It is owned by the city and county.

== Climate ==
Sampson County is located in the humid subtropical climate (Köppen climate classification Cfa) zone, with mostly moderate temperatures year round. Winters are mild across Sampson, with the warmest winter temperatures found in the southern portion of the county due to the influence of the nearby Atlantic Ocean. The average high temperature in January is around 55 °F (13 °C). Summers are hot and humid, with the hottest summer temperatures found in the northern areas of Sampson County. The average high temperature in July is around 90 °F (32 °C).

During frontal passages, temperatures can vary widely across Sampson County due to its large size, spanning nearly 70 miles from north to south. Occasionally, temperatures can be in the 40s °F in northern areas of the county, as southern areas of Sampson remain in the 60s °F before the front completes its passage.

The USDA hardiness zones for Sampson County are Zone 8A (10 °F to 15 °F or -12 °C to -9 °C) and Zone 8B (15 °F to 20 °F or -9 °C to -6 °C).

=== Extreme temperatures ===
Although uncommon, extreme temperatures can occur in Sampson County.

- In December 1989, Clinton recorded a new record low temperature of -2 °F (-19 °C).
- In August 1983, Clinton recorded a new record high temperature of 103 °F (39 °C).

=== Frost ===
Frost does occur in Sampson County. Most of the county experiences 50–75 days of frost conditions annually. However, far southern areas of Sampson experience only 40–50 days of frost conditions annually, due to its proximity to the Atlantic Ocean.

=== Snow ===
Like much of eastern North Carolina, snow is rare in Sampson County. On average, light snowfall occurs once or twice every 10 years.

== Demographics ==
Historical population
Census	Pop.	Note	%±
1790	6,162		—
1800	6,719		9.0%
1810	6,620		−1.5%
1820	8,908		34.6%
1830	11,634		30.6%
1840	12,157		4.5%
1850	14,585		20.0%
1860	16,624		14.0%
1870	16,436		−1.1%
1880	22,894		39.3%
1890	25,096		9.6%
1900	26,380		5.1%
1910	29,982		13.7%
1920	36,002		20.1%
1930	40,082		11.3%
1940	47,440		18.4%
1950	49,780		4.9%
1960	48,013		−3.5%
1970	44,954		−6.4%
1980	49,687		10.5%
1990	47,297		−4.8%
2000	60,161		27.2%
2010	63,431		5.4%
2020	59,036		−6.9%
2025 (est.)	61,504	▲	4.2%
U.S. Decennial Census; 1790–1960 1900–1990; 1990–2000 2010 2020

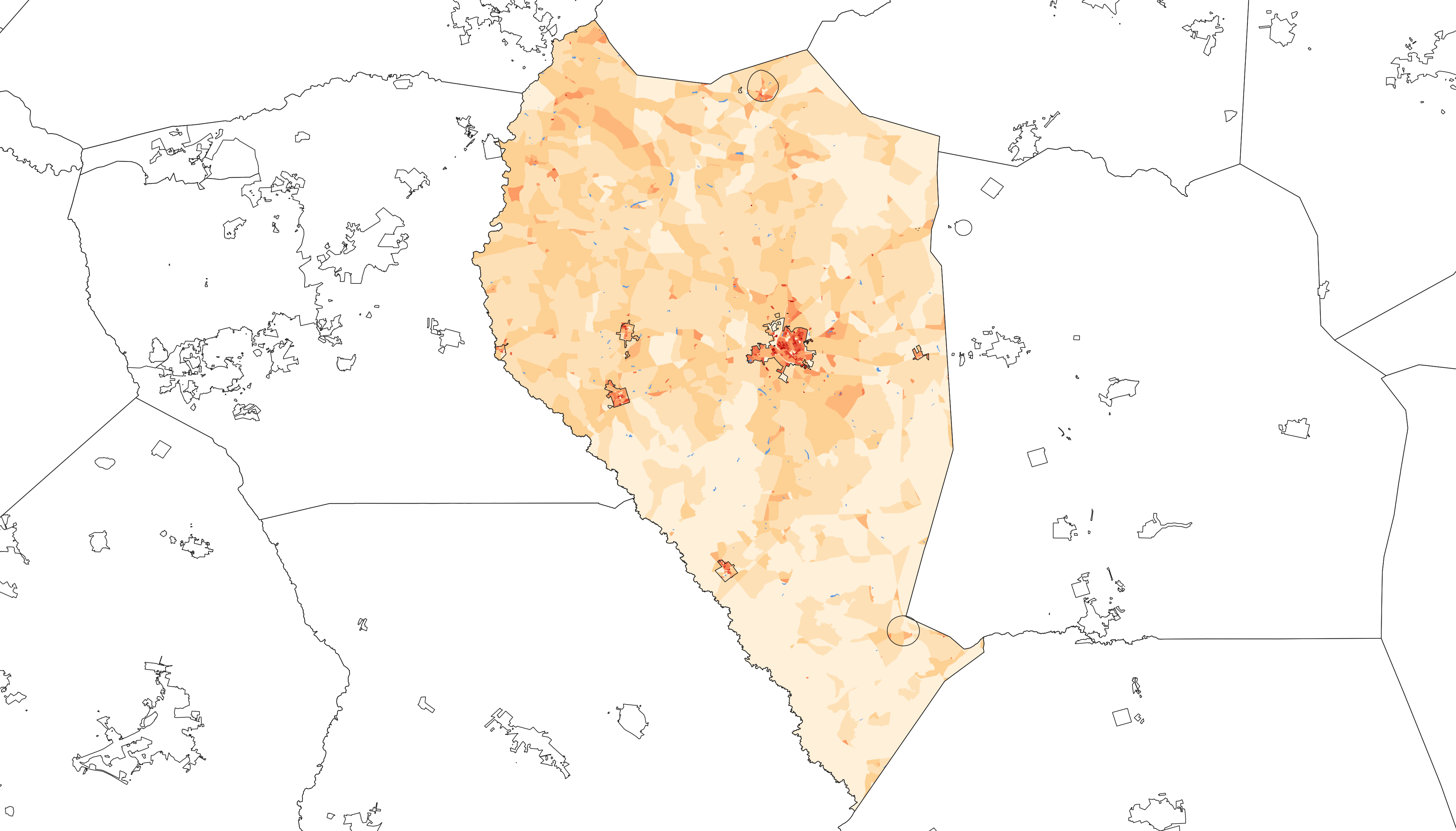
2020 population density of Sampson County NC by census block

=== Racial and ethnic composition ===
Sampson County, North Carolina – Racial and ethnic composition Note: the US Census treats Hispanic/Latino as an ethnic category. This table excludes Latinos from the racial categories and assigns them to a separate category. Hispanics/Latinos may be of any race.
Race / Ethnicity (NH = Non-Hispanic)	Pop 1980	Pop 1990	Pop 2000	Pop 2010	Pop 2020	% 1980	% 1990	% 2000	% 2010	% 2020
White alone (NH)	31,665	30,016	34,190	33,754	29,729	63.73%	63.46%	56.83%	53.21%	50.36%
Black or African American alone (NH)	16,616	15,630	17,871	16,948	13,944	33.44%	33.05%	29.71%	26.72%	23.62%
Native American or Alaska Native alone (NH)	884	847	1,029	1,130	1,002	1.78%	1.79%	1.71%	1.78%	1.70%
Asian alone (NH)	34	70	157	217	216	0.07%	0.15%	0.26%	0.34%	0.37%
Native Hawaiian or Pacific Islander alone (NH)	x	x	20	43	18	x	x	0.03%	0.07%	0.03%
Other race alone (NH)	27	7	48	81	156	0.05%	0.01%	0.08%	0.13%	0.26%
Mixed race or Multiracial (NH)	x	x	369	818	1,722	x	x	0.61%	1.29%	2.92%
Hispanic or Latino (any race)	461	727	6,477	10,440	12,249	0.93%	1.54%	10.77%	16.46%	20.75%
Total	49,687	47,297	60,161	63,431	59,036	100.00%	100.00%	100.00%	100.00%	100.00%

=== 2020 census ===
As of the 2020 census, there were 59,036 people, 22,562 households, and 15,705 families residing in the county. The median age was 40.5 years; 23.9% of residents were under the age of 18 and 18.1% were 65 years of age or older. For every 100 females there were 96.4 males, and for every 100 females age 18 and over there were 93.6 males age 18 and over.

The racial makeup of the county was 52.9% White, 23.9% Black or African American, 2.2% American Indian and Alaska Native, 0.4% Asian, <0.1% Native Hawaiian and Pacific Islander, 14.4% from some other race, and 6.1% from two or more races. Hispanic or Latino residents of any race comprised 20.7% of the population.

15.8% of residents lived in urban areas, while 84.2% lived in rural areas.

Of the 22,562 households, 32.7% had children under the age of 18 living in them, 46.3% were married-couple households, 17.6% were households with a male householder and no spouse or partner present, and 30.4% were households with a female householder and no spouse or partner present. About 27.2% of all households were made up of individuals and 13.7% had someone living alone who was 65 years of age or older.

There were 25,481 housing units, of which 11.5% were vacant. Among occupied housing units, 70.2% were owner-occupied and 29.8% were renter-occupied. The homeowner vacancy rate was 0.9% and the rental vacancy rate was 6.6%.

=== 2010 census ===
At the 2010 census, there were 63,431 people, 22,624 households, and 16,214 families residing in the county. The population density was 67.1 people per square mile (25.9 people/km^{2}). There were 26,476 housing units at an average density of 27 units per square mile (10 units/km^{2}). The racial makeup of the county was 56.7% White, 27% Black or African American, 2% Native American, 0.4% Asian, 0.1% Pacific Islander and 2% from two or more races. 16.5% of the population were Hispanic or Latino of any race.

There were 22,273 households, out of which 33.40% had children under the age of 18 living with them, 53.60% were married couples living together, 14.30% had a female householder with no husband present, and 27.20% were non-families. 23.70% of all households were made up of individuals, and 10.20% had someone living alone who was 65 years of age or older. The average household size was 2.64 and the average family size was 3.09.

In the county, the population was spread out, with 25.80% under the age of 18, 9.40% from 18 to 24, 29.70% from 25 to 44, 22.30% from 45 to 64, and 12.80% who were 65 years of age or older. The median age was 35 years. For every 100 females there were 98.20 males. For every 100 females age 18 and over, there were 95.90 males.

The median income for a household in the county was $31,793, and the median income for a family was $38,072. Males had a median income of $26,806 versus $20,657 for females. The per capita income for the county was $14,976. About 13.50% of families and 17.60% of the population were below the poverty line, including 21.50% of those under age 18 and 21.50% of those age 65 or over.

Sampson County is also one of the largest producers of hogs in the nation, and second in the state, with a population of over 2 million hogs.

== Government and politics ==
The county was unusual in the South in turning strongly towards the Republican Party between the 1890s and World War II – a time when most of the region was solidifying as the overwhelmingly Democratic "Solid South". Even with its historic Populism a fading memory, and no Unionist history, Sampson was one of seven North Carolina counties to vote for Wendell Willkie in 1940, and one of fourteen to vote for Thomas E. Dewey in 1944. This was due to the fact that it was the leading center for the Populist Party during the 1890s under local hero Marion Butler – more so indeed than Nash and Chatham counties which had given James B. Weaver a plurality in the 1892 election – and the fact that to compete with the dominant Democratic Party the two would fuse, with the result that after the Populists' demise its adherents turned to the Republicans.

North Carolina's 7th congressional district, since 2025

United States presidential election results for Sampson County, North Carolina
Year	Republican		Democratic		Third party(ies)	
Year	No.	%	No.	%	No.	%
1912	84	2.17%	1,265	32.69%	2,521	65.14%
1916	2,727	66.58%	1,369	33.42%	0	0.00%
1920	5,353	68.81%	2,426	31.19%	0	0.00%
1924	3,188	60.79%	2,021	38.54%	35	0.67%
1928	5,579	70.94%	2,285	29.06%	0	0.00%
1932	4,127	45.09%	4,911	53.66%	114	1.25%
1936	4,948	45.46%	5,937	54.54%	0	0.00%
1940	5,769	53.04%	5,107	46.96%	0	0.00%
1944	6,062	58.96%	4,220	41.04%	0	0.00%
1948	4,932	46.76%	4,965	47.07%	651	6.17%
1952	6,449	48.11%	6,956	51.89%	0	0.00%
1956	6,685	48.16%	7,197	51.84%	0	0.00%
1960	7,338	49.02%	7,632	50.98%	0	0.00%
1964	7,634	48.62%	8,067	51.38%	0	0.00%
1968	6,597	41.44%	4,797	30.13%	4,527	28.43%
1972	9,684	65.76%	4,888	33.19%	154	1.05%
1976	6,968	43.82%	8,869	55.77%	65	0.41%
1980	8,097	46.06%	9,090	51.71%	391	2.22%
1984	10,665	53.87%	9,115	46.04%	16	0.08%
1988	8,524	51.49%	8,009	48.38%	22	0.13%
1992	8,007	43.12%	8,698	46.84%	1,863	10.03%
1996	8,241	47.82%	8,150	47.30%	841	4.88%
2000	10,410	54.11%	8,768	45.57%	61	0.32%
2004	12,600	56.53%	9,649	43.29%	39	0.17%
2008	14,038	53.91%	11,836	45.46%	164	0.63%
2012	14,422	55.10%	11,566	44.19%	186	0.71%
2016	14,838	57.23%	10,547	40.68%	543	2.09%
2020	17,411	60.84%	10,966	38.32%	241	0.84%
2024	18,178	64.46%	9,797	34.74%	226	0.80%

In the North Carolina House of Representatives, Sampson County is in the 22nd district with Bladen County, represented by Republican William D. Brisson, In the North Carolina Senate, it lies within the 9th district, represented by Republican Brent Jackson.

In the United States House of Representatives, Sampson County lies within North Carolina's 3rd congressional district, represented by Republican Greg Murphy. Beginning in 2025, the northwestern areas of Sampson will lie within North Carolina's 7th congressional district, represented by Republican David Rouzer.

Sampson County is a member of the regional Mid-Carolina Council of Governments.

== Economy ==
Historically, Sampson County has been an agricultural county with a slow rise in population since the creation of the county. The agricultural sector continues to be one of the leading pillars of the economy. Leading industries prior to the 20th century were naval stores, timber and agriculture. After the Civil War, the Naval Stores and timber industries began to lose production value in the county to the lack of cheap labor due to the eradication of slavery among other factors; as a result, subsistence agriculture became the primary industry. The county has steadily gained stronger manufacturing and services industries since the Civil War.

As of 2007, agricultural land covered over 50% of the county's land area. A wide range of crops are grown in the county ranging from vegetables, fruits and berries to tobacco, peanuts, corn, soybeans and wheat. Manufacturing, agriculture, healthcare, education and retail are the primary sources of employment in the county.

As of 2012, Sampson County is the largest producer of hay and flue-cured tobacco in North Carolina. Sampson County is the largest producer of turkeys and the second largest producer of hogs in the state.

== Education ==
Sampson County has a county-wide public school system for the grades of K-12 with the exception of the city of Clinton, which has its own public school district for grades K-12. The only post-secondary public institution in the county is Sampson Community College. Hobbton High School is the oldest school building in Sampson County; located in Newton Grove, it is a small 1A school.

=== County schools ===
Elementary schools

- Clement
- Hargrove
- Hobbton
- Midway
- Plain View
- Roseboro
- Salemburg
- Union

Intermediate school

- Union

Middle schools

- Hobbton
- Midway
- Union
- Roseboro-Salemburg

High schools

- Union
- Hobbton
- Midway
- Lakewood
- Sampson Early College High School

=== Clinton City Schools ===
Elementary schools

- Butler Avenue
- L.C. Kerr
- Sunset Avenue

Middle school

- Sampson

High school

- Clinton

=== Libraries ===
The Sampson County Library System serves Sampson County residents through four different libraries and a specialized outreach service intended for patrons who are home-bound and unable to visit the library. The libraries share a publicly accessible catalog and courier service. The Sampson County Library System offers online resources including eBooks, audiobooks, numerous genealogy databases, and online Driver's Education. The libraries also participate in Interlibrary Loan services. Computer classes and Story Time programs are offered at the member libraries.

Library Locations

- J.C. Holliday Library (Clinton)
- Bryan Memorial Library (Newton Grove)
- Miriam Lamb Memorial Library (Garland)
- Roseboro Public Library (Roseboro)

The J.C. Holliday Library in Clinton is the headquarters library for the county. It houses the largest collection of items including research materials and a local history and genealogy collection. There are also reference and children's services provided at this branch.

== Communities ==
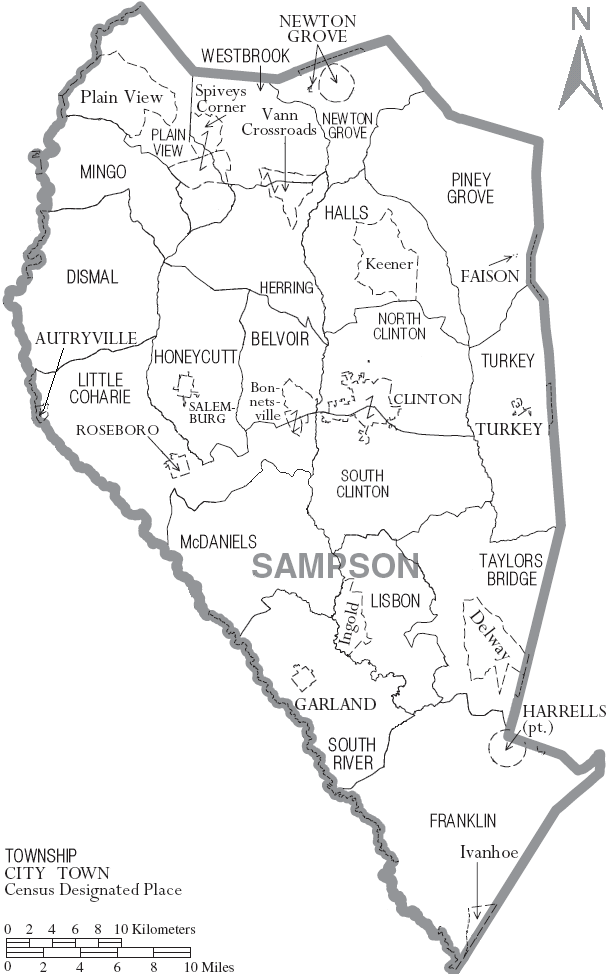
Map of Sampson County with municipal and township labels

=== City ===
- Clinton (county seat and largest community)

=== Towns ===
- Autryville
- Garland
- Harrells
- Newton Grove
- Roseboro
- Salemburg
- Turkey

=== Census-designated places ===
- Bonnetsville
- Delway
- Ingold
- Ivanhoe
- Keener
- Plain View
- Spiveys Corner
- Vann Crossroads

=== Unincorporated communities ===
- Moltonville
- Rebel City
- Suttontown

=== Townships ===
- Belvoir
- Dismal
- Franklin
- Halls
- Herring
- Honeycutt
- Lisbon
- Little Coharie
- McDaniels
- Mingo
- Newton Grove
- North Clinton
- Piney Grove
- Plain View
- South Clinton
- South River
- Taylors Bridge
- Turkey
- Westbrook

== Notable people ==
- Micajah Autry, American merchant, poet and lawyer who died in the Texas Revolution at the Battle of the Alamo
- Theophilus H. Holmes, United States Army officer and a Confederate Lieutenant General in the American Civil War
- James Kenan, military leader of the American Revolutionary War, and an early senator of the state of North Carolina
- Robert Herring Wright, first president of East Carolina Teachers Training School
- Marion Butler, Populist U.S. senator from North Carolina between 1895 and 1901. and brother of George Edwin Butler
- George Edwin Butler, local Lawyer, Civic Leader, and Author of The Croatan Indians of Sampson County, North Carolina. Their Origin and Racial Status. A Plea for Separate Schools
- Lauch Faircloth, Republican U.S. Senator between 1993 and 1999, born January 14, 1928
- Gwendolyn Faison, former mayor of Camden, New Jersey (2000–2010)
- Gabriel Holmes, 21st governor of North Carolina between 1821 and 1824
- Theophilus H. Holmes, U.S. Army officer and Confederate general in the American Civil War
- Rufus G. Herring, United States Naval Reserve Officer and recipient of the Medal of Honor for his actions in World War II
- William R. King, politician and diplomat who was elected both to the House of Representatives and the Senate. In 1852, he was elected as the 13th US vice-president on a ticket with Franklin Pierce
- John Merrick, African American entrepreneur, founder and president of North Carolina Mutual Life Insurance Company, which for much of the 20th century was the largest company run by African Americans in the U.S.
- Curtis Smith, World Champion and Hall of Fame Drag Racer
- Willie Weeks, American Bass Guitarist and Musician

== See also ==
- List of counties in North Carolina
- National Register of Historic Places listings in Sampson County, North Carolina
