= Comedy Tonight (disambiguation) =

Comedy Tonight may refer to:

- "Comedy Tonight" (song), from A Funny Thing Happened on the Way to the Forum, a 1962 musical by Stephen Sondheim
- Comedy Tonight (1970 series), a summer 1970 CBS TV show; see 1969–70 United States network television schedule
- Comedy Tonight (PBS series), a 1981–91 San Francisco standup showcase
- Comedy Tonight (syndicated series), a 1985–86 New York standup showcase presented by Bill Boggs
- Comedy Tonight, a 1977 Wayne Federman show
