= USS Jack H. Lucas =

Guided missile destroyer

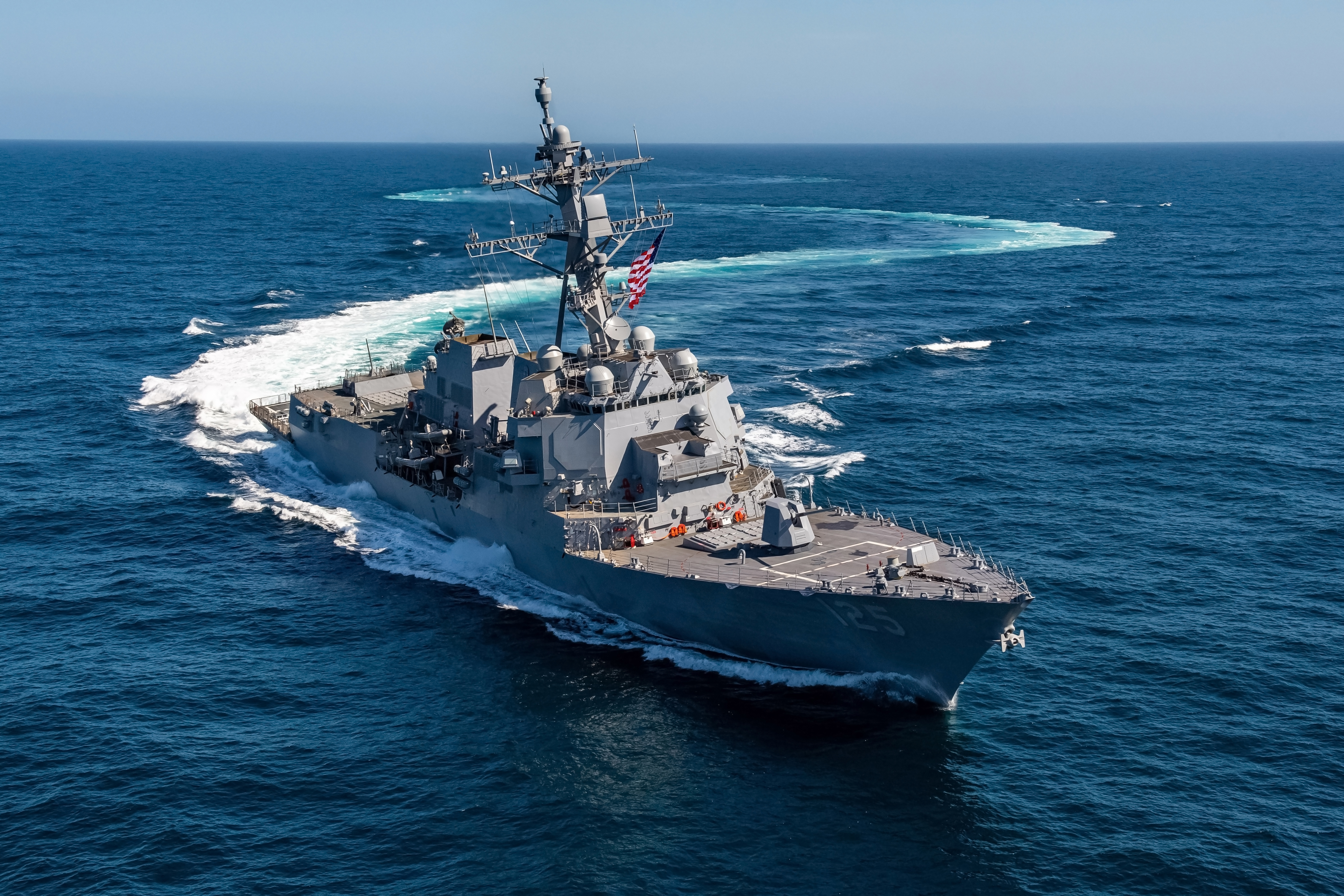
- USS Jack H. Lucas (DDG-125) during acceptance trials

History

United States
- Name: Jack H. Lucas
- Namesake: Jacklyn H. Lucas
- Builder: Huntington-Ingalls Shipbuilding
- Laid down: 8 November 2019
- Launched: 4 June 2021
- Sponsored by: Ruby Lucas; Catherine B. Reynolds
- Christened: 26 March 2022
- Acquired: 27 June 2023
- Commissioned: 7 October 2023
- Home port: San Diego, California
- Identification: Hull number: DDG-125
- Motto: Indestructible
- Status: in active service
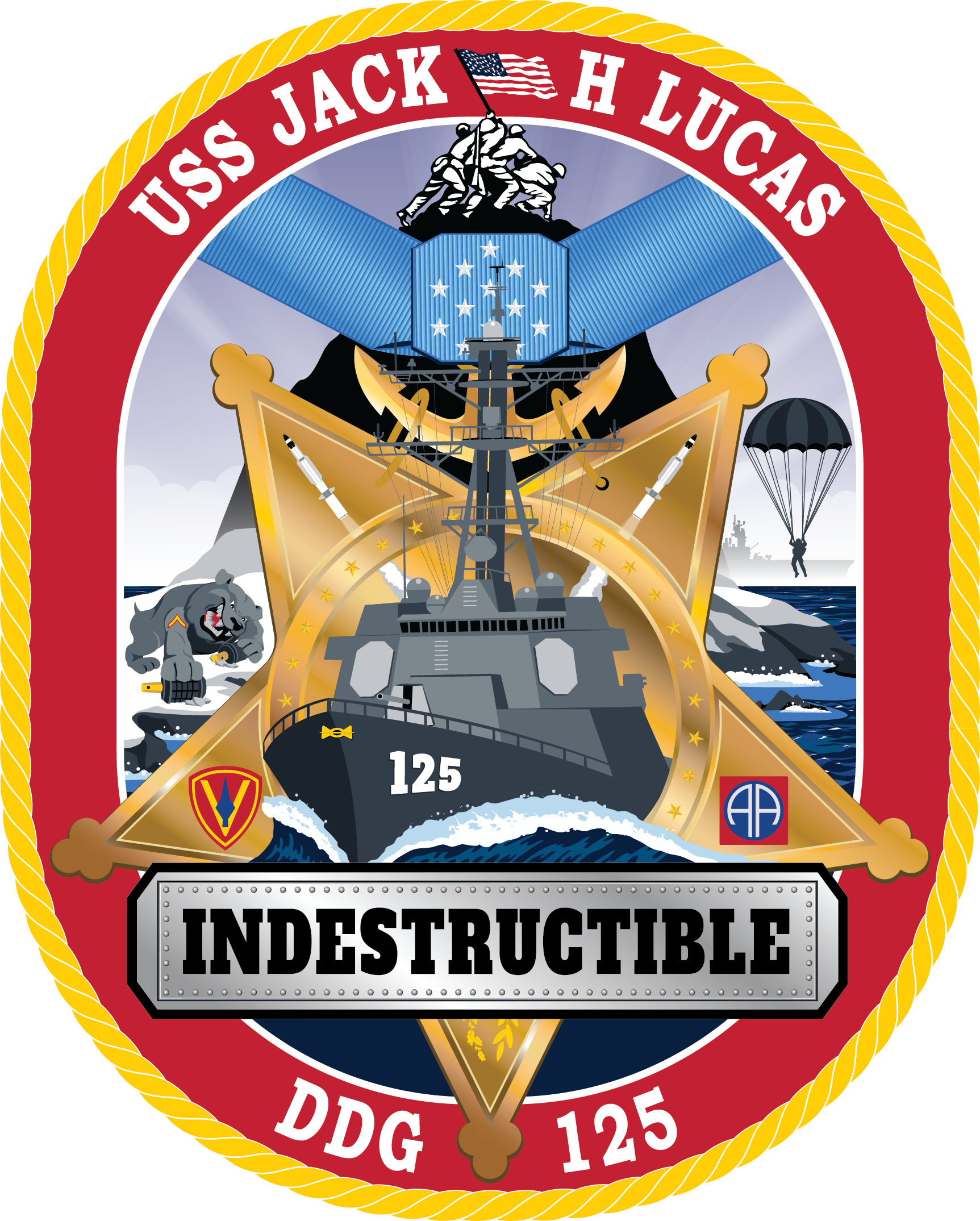
- Badge

General characteristics
- Class & type: Arleigh Burke-class destroyer
- Displacement: 9,496 long tons (full load)
- Length: 509.5 ft (155.3 m)
- Beam: 66 ft (20 m)
- Propulsion: 4 × General Electric LM2500 gas turbines 100,000 shp (75,000 kW)
- Speed: 31 knots (57 km/h; 36 mph)
- Complement: 380 officers and enlisted
- Armament: Guns: 1 × 5-inch (127 mm)/62 Mk 45 Mod 4 (lightweight gun); 1 × 20 mm (0.8 in) Phalanx CIWS; 2 × 25 mm (0.98 in) Mk 38 machine gun system; 4 × 0.50 in (12.7 mm) caliber guns; Missiles: 1 × 32-cell, 1 × 64-cell (96 total cells) Mk 41 vertical launching system (VLS): RIM-66M surface-to-air missile; RIM-156 surface-to-air missile; RIM-174A Standard ERAM; RIM-161 anti-ballistic missile; RIM-162 ESSM (quad-packed); BGM-109 Tomahawk cruise missile; RUM-139 vertical launch ASROC; Torpedoes: 2 × Mark 32 triple torpedo tubes: Mark 46 lightweight torpedo; Mark 50 lightweight torpedo; Mark 54 lightweight torpedo
- Armor: Kevlar-type armor with steel hull. Numerous passive survivability measures.
- Aircraft carried: 2 × MH-60R Seahawk helicopters
- Aviation facilities: Double hangar and helipad

USS Jack H. Lucas (DDG-125) is an Arleigh Burke-class (Flight III) Aegis guided missile destroyer, the first of the Flight III variants. She is named after then-Marine Corps Private First Class, later United States Army captain Jacklyn H. Lucas, recipient of the Medal of Honor. On 17 September 2016, she was named by Secretary of the Navy Ray Mabus.

== Construction ==
Jack H. Lucas was launched on 4 June 2021, and christened 26 March 2022. The ship was commissioned on 7 October 2023 with the ceremony taking place in Tampa, Florida.

== Operational history ==
Jack H. Lucas left Ingalls on 12 December 2022 for three days of sea trials before returning to port on 15 December 2022.

On 27 June 2023, the US Navy formally took delivery of Jack H. Lucas from Ingalls. She remained in Pascagoula for another 120 days after delivery to allow the crew to move onto the ship.

On 26 September 2023, Jack H. Lucas left Ingalls for her home port in San Diego, California, with a stopover in Florida. She was commissioned in Tampa Bay on 7 October 2023.

== Namesake ==
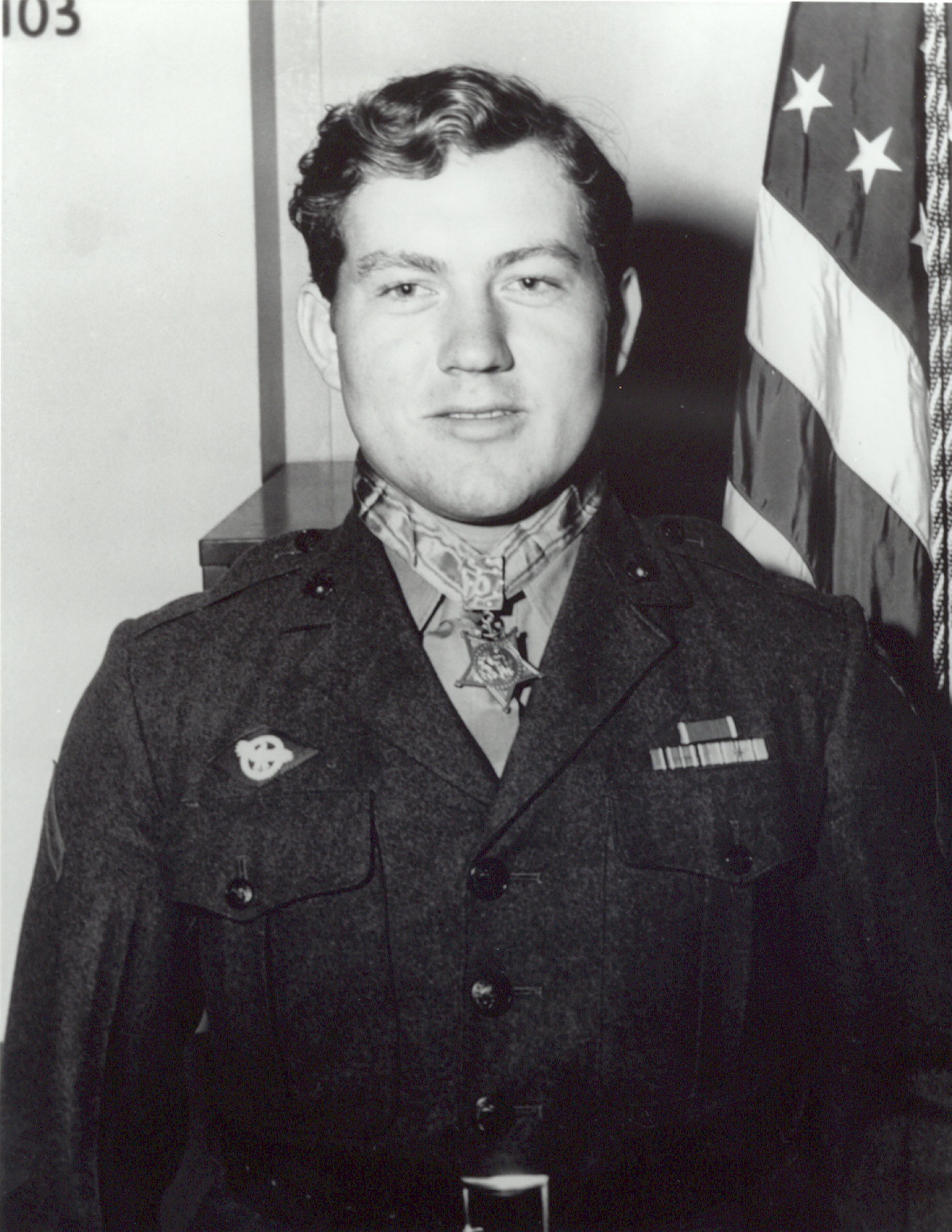
Jacklyn H. Lucas

Jacklyn Harold "Jack" Lucas (1928–2008) was a U.S. Marine, and later U.S. Army airborne officer, who received the Medal of Honor for his actions at the Battle of Iwo Jima, at the age of 17. He is the youngest Marine and youngest serviceman in World War II to be awarded the United States' highest military decoration for valor. When the keel of USS Iwo Jima (LHD-7) was laid in 1997, Lucas placed his Medal of Honor citation in the ship's hull, where it remains sealed.
