= Jacklyn H. Lucas =

American Marine and Medal of Honor Recipient (1928–2008)

Jacklyn Harold Lucas
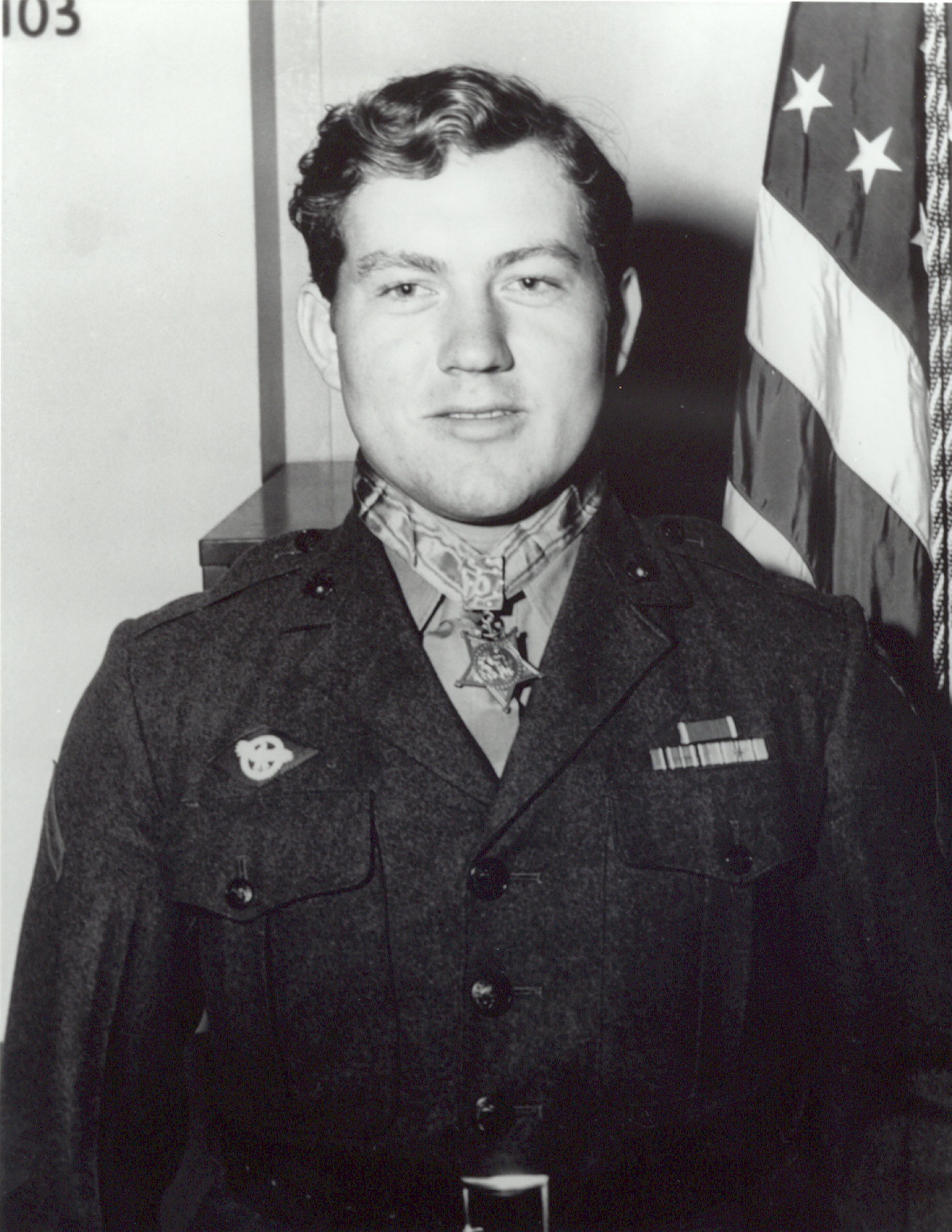
- Born: February 14, 1928; Plymouth, North Carolina, U.S.
- Died: June 5, 2008 (aged 80); Hattiesburg, Mississippi, U.S.
- Burial place: Highland Cemetery, Hattiesburg, Mississippi
- Military career
- Allegiance: United States of America
- Branch: United States Marine Corps; United States Army
- Service years: 1942–1945 (U.S. Marine Corps); 1961–1965 (U.S. Army)
- Rank: Private first class (US Marine Corps); Captain (U.S. Army)
- Nickname: Jack
- Units: 1st Battalion, 26th Marine Regiment, 5th Marine Division; 82nd Airborne Division
- Conflicts: World War II; Battle of Iwo Jima
- Awards: Medal of Honor; Purple Heart Medal

Jacklyn Harold "Jack" Lucas (February 14, 1928 – June 5, 2008) was an American Marine in World War II who was awarded the Medal of Honor at the age of 17 as a Private First Class in the Marine Corps during the Battle of Iwo Jima.

During a close firefight in two trenches between Lucas and three Marines with 11 Japanese soldiers, Lucas saved the lives of the other three Marines from two enemy hand grenades which had been thrown into their trench by unhesitatingly placing himself on one grenade, while in the next instant pulling the other grenade under him. The grenade he covered with his body exploded, and wounded him severely; the other grenade failed to explode.

He is the youngest Marine and the youngest serviceman in World War II to be awarded the United States' highest military decoration for valor.

He later was commissioned in the United States Army and eventually reached the rank of captain.

On October 7, 2023, the United States Navy commissioned the USS Jack H. Lucas (DDG 125) in his honor at the Port of Tampa, Tampa Bay, Florida.

== Early years ==
Lucas was born in Plymouth, North Carolina, on February 14, 1928. After his father, a tobacco farmer, died when he was 11, his mother sent him to nearby Edwards Military Institute in Salemburg. He rose to be a cadet captain, and was the captain of a football team. He was an all-around sportsman, also taking part in baseball, softball, basketball, boxing, wrestling, horseback riding, trap and skeet shooting, and hunting.

== U.S. Marine Corps Reserve ==
=== World War II ===
On August 8, 1942, Lucas enlisted in the Marine Corps Reserve at Norfolk, Virginia, forging his mother's name on the parental consent form falsely giving his age as 17 and bribing a notary. He was, in fact, only 14 years old, but was 5 ft 8 in (173 cm) and 180 pounds (82 kg) with a muscular build. He was sent directly to Marine Corps Recruit Depot Parris Island, South Carolina, for recruit training. During his rifle qualification, he qualified as a sharpshooter.

Lucas was next assigned to the Marine barracks at Naval Air Station Jacksonville, Florida. In June 1943, he was transferred to the 21st Replacement Battalion at Marine Corps Air Station New River, North Carolina, and one month later he went to the 25th Replacement Battalion, and successfully completed schooling at Camp Lejeune, North Carolina, which qualified him as a heavy machine gun crewman. He was sent by train to San Diego with his unit. He left the continental United States on November 4, 1943, and the following month he joined the 6th Base Depot of the V Amphibious Corps at Pearl Harbor, Hawaii. On January 29, 1944, he was promoted to Private First Class.

On January 10, 1945, according to statements he made to his comrades, Lucas walked out of camp to join a combat organization wearing a khaki uniform and carrying his dungarees and field shoes in a roll under his arm. He was declared UA (Unauthorized Absence) when he failed to return that night. He stowed away on board the USS Deuel, which was transporting the 1st Battalion, 26th Marines of the 5th Marine Division to Iwo Jima. On February 8, the day before he would have been placed on the Marine Corps "deserter list", he turned himself in to Marine Captain Robert Dunlap, commanding officer of C Company. He was taken by Dunlap to the battalion's commanding officer, Lieutenant Colonel Daniel C. Pollock, who assigned him to Dunlap's rifle company as a rifleman; his punishment for going UA was an administrative reduction in rank to Private. On February 14, Lucas had his 17th birthday while at sea, five days before the invasion of Iwo Jima began.

On February 19, Lucas participated in the 5th Division's landing on Iwo Jima with C Company, 1st Battalion, 26th Marines. On February 20, Lucas and three Marines who were members of a four-man fire team from one of C Company's platoons were creeping through a twisting ravine towards or at an enemy airstrip when they spotted an enemy pillbox and took cover in a trench. They then spotted 11 Japanese soldiers in a parallel trench (they had a tunnel to there from the pillbox) and opened fire on them with rifles. The Japanese also opened fire and threw two grenades inside the Marines' trench in front of them. Lucas spotted the grenades on the ground in front of his comrades and yelled "grenades". He then jumped over a Marine and dove for them, jamming one of them into the volcanic ash and soft sand with his rifle and covering it with his body, while reaching out and pulling the other one beneath him. One grenade exploded, tossing Lucas onto his back and severely wounding him in the right arm and wrist, right leg and thigh, and chest. He was still conscious and barely alive after the blast, holding in his left hand the other grenade, which did not explode. His three comrades were unharmed, and the Japanese soldiers in their trench were all killed. The three Marines left, believing Lucas was dead.

Lucas was found by Marines from another unit passing by, who called for Navy corpsmen that attended to his wounds and protected him with a carbine from being shot and killed by a Japanese soldier in the trench. He was evacuated by stretcher bearers to the beach, onto an LST to a cargo ship used as a hospital (all the hospital ships were full) and then to the hospital ship Samaritan. He was treated at various field hospitals prior to his arrival in San Francisco, California, on March 28, 1945. He eventually underwent 21 surgeries. For the rest of his life, there remained about 200 pieces of metal, some the size of .22 caliber bullets (0.55 cm), in his body, which frequently set off airport metal detectors. In August, the mark of attempted desertion was removed from his record while he was a patient at the U.S. Naval Hospital at Charleston, South Carolina. On September 18, he was discharged from the Marine Corps Reserve because of disability resulting from his wounds following his reappointment to the rank of Private First Class.

On October 5, 1945, Lucas, three sailors and ten other Marines, including Robert Dunlap, his former company commanding officer on Iwo Jima, were presented the Medal of Honor by President Harry S. Truman during a ceremony on the South Lawn of the White House. Those in attendance at the ceremony included Lucas's mother and brother, Admiral Chester Nimitz and Secretary of Defense James Forrestal.

== Later life ==
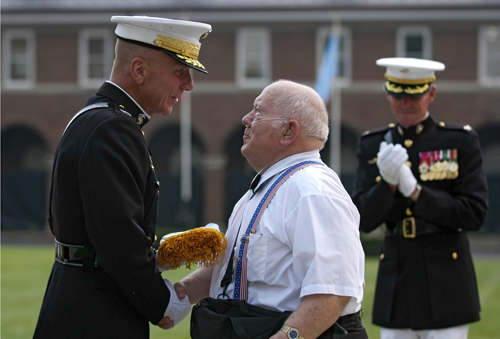
Lucas receives his Medal of Honor Flag from CMC Gen. Hagee on August 3, 2006.

Lucas earned a business degree from High Point University and was initiated into the Pi Kappa Alpha fraternity (Delta Omega chapter).

He joined the United States Army in 1961 and served in the 82nd Airborne Division as a paratrooper to conquer his fear of heights. He reportedly survived a training jump in which both of his parachutes malfunctioned. He volunteered to serve in the Vietnam War, but was not allowed to go, and ended his time as a Captain in 1965 at Fort Bragg, North Carolina, training younger troops who would see action in Vietnam.

After his military service ended, Lucas married, fathered several children and established a profitable chain of butcher shops in Maryland. However, he accrued back taxes with the IRS, depriving him of his disability benefits. In 1977, Lucas was notified by Maryland police that his second wife and son-in-law were plotting to kill him; the two pleaded guilty to conspiracy and were granted probation after Lucas asked the court to show mercy. By the 1980s, Lucas was living off his life savings. In 1985, his mobile home burned down, forcing him to camp. In August of that year, Lucas was arrested when marijuana plants were found in the corn field he was camping in. The State of Maryland initially planned to charge Lucas with unlawful manufacture and possession of controlled dangerous substances, but the charges were eventually dropped.

When the keel of the USS Iwo Jima (LHD-7) (christened in 2000) was laid, Lucas placed his Medal of Honor citation in the ship's hull, where it remains sealed.

On August 3, 2006, Lucas, along with 15 other living Marine Medal of Honor recipients, was presented the Medal of Honor flag by Commandant of the Marine Corps General Michael Hagee at the Marine Barracks in Washington, D.C., in front of over 1,000 people, including family, friends and Marines. Lucas said of the ceremony, "To have these young men here in our presence — it just rejuvenates this old heart of mine. I love the Corps even more knowing that my country is defended by such fine young people."

Lucas died at a hospital in Hattiesburg, Mississippi, on June 5, 2008, of leukemia, with family and friends by his side. He was survived by his wife, four sons, a daughter, seven grandchildren, and six great-grandchildren.

On September 18, 2016, Secretary of the Navy Ray Mabus announced an Arleigh Burke-class destroyer, USS Jack H. Lucas, would be named in his honor of.

The Jack H. Lucas left Ingalls on September 27, 2023 and was commissioned in Tampa, Florida on October 7, 2023.

== Medal of Honor citation ==
Lucas's Medal of Honor citation reads:

The President of the United States takes pleasure in presenting the MEDAL OF HONOR to

PRIVATE FIRST CLASS JACKLYN H. LUCAS
UNITED STATES MARINE CORPS RESERVE

for service as set forth in the following

CITATION:

For conspicuous gallantry and intrepidity at the risk of his life above and beyond the call of duty while serving with the First Battalion, Twenty-sixth Marines, Fifth Marine Division, during action against enemy Japanese forces on Iwo Jima, Volcano Islands 20 February 1945. While creeping through a treacherous, twisting ravine which ran in close proximity to a fluid and uncertain front line on D-plus-1 Day, Private First Class Lucas and three other men were suddenly ambushed by a hostile patrol which savagely attacked with rifle fire and grenades. Quick to act when the lives of the small group were endangered by two grenades which landed directly in front of them, Private First Class Lucas unhesitatingly hurled himself over his comrades upon one grenade and pulled the other one under him, absorbing the whole blasting force of the explosions in his own body in order to shield his companions from the concussion and murderous flying fragments. By his inspiring action and valiant spirit of self-sacrifice, he not only protected his comrades from certain injury or possible death, but also enabled them to rout the Japanese patrol and continue the advance. His exceptionally courageous initiative and loyalty reflect the highest credit upon Private First Class Lucas and the United States Naval Service.

== Awards and decorations ==
Lucas's military decorations and awards include:

Badge	Parachutists Badge		
1st row	Medal of Honor		
2nd row	Purple Heart	Combat Action Ribbon	American Campaign Medal
3rd row	Asiatic-Pacific Campaign Medal with 1 Campaign stars	World War II Victory Medal	National Defense Service Medal
Unit awards	Navy Presidential Unit Citation with 1 Service star		

== See also ==
- List of Medal of Honor recipients for World War II
- List of Medal of Honor recipients for the Battle of Iwo Jima
