= The Chronicles of Federman =

Live album by Wayne Federman
- Released: August 15, 2016
- Recorded: 1984–2015
- Genre: Stand-up comedy
- Length: 2:08:11
- Label: Aspecialthing Records
- Producer: Matt Belknap and Ryan McManemin

The Chronicles of Federman is a 41-track three-volume comedy album spanning the career of comedian Wayne Federman released in 2016 on Aspecialthing Records. It was recorded over 31 years at various venues throughout the USA.

== Track listing ==
All tracks written by Wayne Federman.

Disc 1

1. Intro/84 Olympics/Disney/Rambo
2. Origami/Physicals/Football
3. NY Beaches/Back Rubs/Crush
4. Bad Haircut/Religious/AMC Gremlin
5. Newlywed/Air Florida/Gefilte Fish
6. Folk Singers/Steve Miller/Janis
7. Acoustic/Electric Ukulele
8. NY Apartment/Dodgeball/Musical Chairs
9. Baseball Metaphor
10. Skiing
11. Slurpee/Jamaicans/Uke History
12. Ventriloquism

Disc 2

1. Intro/Web Site
2. Extra Work/Days of Thunder
3. Guitar Players/Epilady/Mascots
4. Kiss
5. Working Out/Colleges/Video Rental
6. Taco Bell/Hot Dogs
7. Turning Left/Carpool Lane
8. Oily Skin/Acting Coach/Birthdays/The Bedroom
9. Picked for Sports/Towel Snapping
10. Pink Floyd
11. Underdog/World Book/Surgeon General
12. Jimmy Page/Streisand/Robert Johnson
13. My Bicycle/West Hollywood/Alanis Morissette
14. Rockin With Dokken
15. Mcdonald's/Television Set
16. David Stern Podcast

Disc 3

1. Intro/Mission Statement
2. Book of Questions/Plantation/Elton/Dr./iPhone
3. Carson/99 Cent/Piano/Wayne/Dave Matthews/Enya
4. Without Borders/Beethoven/Nba
5. Hanukkah/Wikipedia/Parents Driving/PBS Jazz
6. My Dream/Memoir/Forever Stamps/Snapped
7. Chuck E. Cheese/La River/Team Names
8. Mobil Mart/Sylvia Plath/Piano 2
9. Largo X-Mas/Carpenters/My Song/Jesus Christ/Abortion
10. Gravity/Woody Allen
11. Medicine/Piano 3/Marathon/NYU
12. Israel
13. Outro
