= Pistol Pete: The Life and Times of Pete Maravich =

Pistol Pete: The Life and Times of Pete Maravich is a documentary about American basketball player "Pistol" Pete Maravich. It first aired on CBS during the Final Four Tournament on April 1, 2001. The film was produced by George Roy, written by Steven Stern, and narrated by Harry Connick, Jr.

The film featured never-before-broadcast game footage, and interviews with Julius Erving, Les Robinson, and Pete Maravich's wife Jackie. Maravich's biographer Wayne Federman is interviewed, and served as a consultant.
