= Wayne Federman =

American comedian

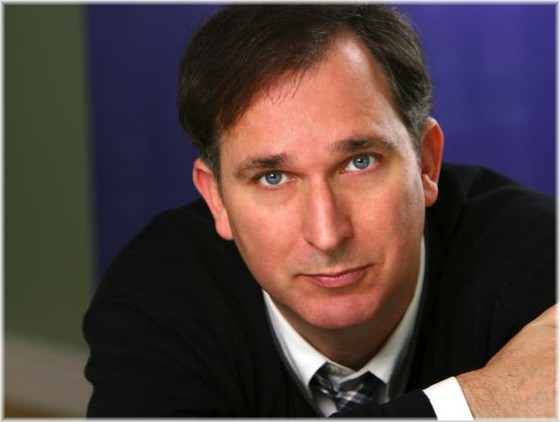
- Federman in 2005
- Born: June 22, 1959 (age 67); Los Angeles, California, U.S.
- Education: New York University
- Notable work: "Dean Weinstock" in Curb Your Enthusiasm; The History of Stand-Up: From Mark Twain to Dave Chappelle; Maravich: The Authorized Biography of Pistol Pete

Comedy career
- Years active: 1983–present
- Medium: Stand-up; television; film; podcast
- Genres: Observational; musical; self-deprecation; biographical
- Subjects: Everyday life; musicians and singers; American culture
- Website: waynefederman.com

Wayne Federman (born June 22, 1959) is an American comedian, actor, author, writer, comedy historian, producer, and musician. He performs in numerous stand-up comedy appearances in clubs, theaters, and on television; wrote a book, The History of Stand-Up; and has had supporting comedic acting roles in The X-Files, The Larry Sanders Show, Curb Your Enthusiasm, Silicon Valley, Legally Blonde, 50 First Dates, The 40-Year-Old Virgin, and Step Brothers. He was the head monologue writer for NBC's Late Night with Jimmy Fallon in its first season. He won a 2022 Primetime Emmy Award for producing the HBO documentary George Carlin's American Dream.

== Background and career ==
=== Early life: 1959–1976 ===
Federman was born in Los Angeles and has five siblings. He grew up in Silver Spring, Maryland and moved to Plantation, Florida at age 10. He played the drums and at 14 began performing in a band at local weddings. He taught himself ventriloquism and performed at various school (often South Plantation High School in Plantation, Florida) functions, local churches, and for service organizations. He reported his high school's sports results on Miami radio station WWOK and made his local television debut on WPLG's Youth and the Issue debating the death penalty.

In 1976, Federman worked as an extra in John Frankenheimer's Black Sunday, filmed at the Miami Orange Bowl. Federman is Jewish.

=== New York City: 1977–1986 ===
In the fall of 1977, Federman was accepted into the Tisch School of the Arts at New York University in Manhattan, New York where he studied with legendary acting coach Stella Adler. He performed his own show, Comedy Tonight, at the Eisner and Lubin Auditorium, with future Broadway star Donna Murphy.

Federman with electric ukulele, circa 1987

After attending NYU, Federman brought his one-man show to the 13th Street Theater. He performed in rotation there with Brother Theodore. Federman also starred in the theater's long-running production of Snow White and the Seven Dwarfs, in which he played six roles. Soon he was performing stand-up comedy at various New York Comedy Clubs, most notably The Comic Strip (now known as Comic Strip Live) and Catch a Rising Star. During those years he incorporated music into his act. He closed his sets by playing hard rock tunes from Led Zeppelin, Jimi Hendrix, Iron Butterfly, and The Rolling Stones on an electric ukulele.

Federman made his national television debut on the syndicated stand-up program Comedy Tonight in 1986. He appeared in two home videos: New Wave Comedy and the Dodge Comedy Showcase.

=== Hollywood: 1987–2008 ===
In 1987, Federman moved to Los Angeles and began working at The Improv, IGBYs, the Laugh Factory, and The Comedy & Magic Club. He taped a series of televised stand-up performances including An Evening at the Improv, George Schlatter's Comedy Club, the CBS Morning Show, 2 Drink Minimum, Star Search, Good Times Cafe, The A-List, and MTV ½ Hour Comedy Hour. He toured extensively, performing at over 200 colleges. He co-founded the improvisational group "No Fat Guy" with Marc Raider, Scott LaRose, and Steve Hytner later briefly forming a music-comedy team with Jordan Brady.

Federman began booking television commercials and appeared in dozens of national spots for clients including Eureka Vacuums, Holiday Inn, U.S. Navy, Wendy's, Taboo, Eagle cars (with Greg Kinnear), McDonald's, Glad Bags, Sprite, Total Raisin Bran, Ford, U.S. Olympic Team, Suzuki Samurai, Sizzler, Del Monte, U.S. Cellular, Coors, and 7–11. He gained some prominence as the first "not exactly" guy in the long-running Hertz Rent A Car campaign. Federman landed small television parts on Baywatch, Amen, Dear John, A Different World, Doogie Howser, M.D., and NewsRadio. He had recurring roles on L.A. Law (3 episodes) and Living Single (3 episodes).

In 1994, Federman made his debut on The Tonight Show and has appeared many times on the program. He also appeared on Late Fridays, Comedy Showcase, and Premium Blend. In 2004, he taped his own 1/2-hour stand-up special for the series, Comedy Central Presents. In 1998, he portrayed Larry Sander's brother Stan on The Larry Sanders Show and was later reunited with Garry Shandling on The X-Files episode "Hollywood A.D.". Written and directed by David Duchovny, the episode followed "Wayne Federman", a Hollywood producer/writer and college friend of assistant FBI director Walter Skinner.

Federman's film roles were in Jack Frost, Dill Scallion, Legally Blonde, 50 First Dates, Charlie's Angels: Full Throttle, The 40-Year-Old Virgin, Unaccompanied Minors, Knocked Up, Step Brothers, Funny People, and The House. He became known for appearing in just one scene in a film and then disappearing; he calls that the "Federman-and-out".

In 2006, Federman landed the recurring role of "Johnson" on the short-lived CBS sitcom Courting Alex. He co-wrote and starred in Max and Josh, a short film which premiered at the 2006 Sundance Film Festival, where it won the Volkswagen Relentless Drive Award. From 2007 to 2013, Federman wrote, produced, and hosted an annual holiday variety show entitled A Very Federman Christmas at the Los Angeles nightclub Largo. Guests included Paul F. Tompkins, Kevin Nealon, Jon Hamm, Dana Gould, Sarah Silverman, Mary Lynn Rajskub, Samm Levine, Margaret Cho, Greg Behrendt, Willie Garson, Paul Williams, Matt Besser, John C. Reilly, and Andrew Daly.

=== Voice-over work ===
In 1990, while shooting a television commercial campaign for McDonald's (directed by Henry Winkler), Federman recorded a series of tie-in radio commercials. That launched his voice-over career. Since then his distinctive voice has been heard on hundreds of radio and television spots. He was the voice of the talking ham and cheese sandwich in the long-running Florida Orange Juice campaign.

He also provided voices for the animated series The Wild Thornberrys, King of the Hill, and American Dad!, as well as the voice of Cartoon Cartoon Friday on the Cartoon Network.

In 2007, Federman voiced a series of Labatt, a Canadian beer, commercials, portraying a fish, a deer, a boulder, and a slab of ice. The ad was eventually pulled and re-edited when viewers complained of the implied vulgarity. In 2015, he voiced a camel (Phil) in a GEICO insurance commercial. In 2022, Federman voiced a character for George Carlin's American Dream, a HBO documentary.

=== Pete Maravich ===
In 2000, Federman began co-authoring (with Marshall Terrill) an authorized biography of NBA basketball legend Pete Maravich. Working closely with the Maravich family, the book, Maravich, was released on January 3, 2007. It became an Amazon sports bestselling book.

In 2000, Federman was interviewed for and served as the senior consultant on, the Emmy award-winning CBS Sports documentary, Pistol Pete: The Life and Times of Pete Maravich. He was featured on both SportsCentury: Pete Maravich on ESPN and in ESPN's SEC Storied documentary entitled Maravich. In 2007, Federman edited a highlight montage entitled The Ultimate Pistol Pete Maravich MIX. The mixture of basketball clips from Maravich's NCAA and NBA careers was posted on YouTube, Yahoo Video, and Google Video. It garnered over one million hits in its first month and was featured in both Sports Illustrated and Dime magazines.

=== Composing, songwriting, and group performances ===
In the 1990s Federman was a founding member of the group Truck Stop Harrys, along with Tudor Sherrard and Matthew Porretta.

Federman co-wrote several songs for the film Dill Scallion and was the music director and keyboardist for Maria Bamford's critically acclaimed The Special Special Special. Beginning in 2014, he became the piano player and music coordinator for Never Not Funny's annual internet telethon, Pardcast-A-Thon.

=== New York City: 2009–2010 ===
In 2009, Federman moved to New York to help launch NBC's Late Night with Jimmy Fallon. He was the show's head monologue writer in its first season and left in January 2010. On April 20, 2010, he unearthed a long-lost live episode of the General Electric Theater while working on a television retrospective for the Reagan Centennial Celebration. The episode, from December 1954, was noteworthy because it featured Ronald Reagan with James Dean. Highlights were broadcast on the CBS Evening News, NBC Nightly News, and Good Morning America. In July 2010, Federman was one of the last comedians to tour and perform for U.S. combat troops throughout Iraq during Operation Iraqi Freedom.

A Federman stand-up jokes about Woody Allen ("I’ve come to really admire Woody Allen. It’s been 14 years, and he’s still married to the same daughter.") was voted the No. 4 joke of the year in 2010 in a survey in the New York Post.

=== Hollywood: 2011–present ===
In June 2011, Federman headlined the Ukulele Festival of Great Britain along with James Hill. The annual Wayne Federman International Film Festival was launched in January 2012, featuring comedians screening movies they love. Participants included Paul F. Tompkins, Garry Shandling, Andy Kindler, Kevin Pollak, Margaret Cho, Doug Benson, Zach Galifianakis, Bill Burr, Will Forte, Sacha Baron Cohen, Chris Hardwick, Lauren Lapkus, Kathy Griffin, Dana Gould, Bill Hader, Patton Oswalt, Tig Notaro, Aziz Ansari, Jeff Garlin, and Sarah Silverman.

In 2014, Federman appeared with singer Kenny Rogers in a national GEICO commercial. In the spot, Rogers sings a portion of his song "The Gambler" during a poker game. In 2012, 2013, 2014, and 2015, Federman co-wrote for the Independent Spirit Awards, hosted by Seth Rogen, Andy Samberg, Oswalt, and the team of Fred Armisen and Kristen Bell respectively. Federman received three Writers Guild of America Award nominations and one Emmy Award nomination for his work.

Federman wrote for the Creative Arts Emmys (2013, 2014, 2015, 2016, 2019), Critics Choice Awards (2016, 2017, 2020), and the Golden Globes (2017), the DGA Awards (2018, 2019, 2020, 2022), and the SAG Awards (2019).

=== Podcasting ===
Federman has guested on over 100 podcasts including Pablo Torre Finds Out, Comedy Bang! Bang!, Never Not Funny, Doug Loves Movies, The Joe Rogan Experience, You Made It Weird, The Adam Carolla Show, The Nerdist Podcast, Ridiculous History, Sup Doc, FitzDog Radio, The Carson Podcast, Improv4Humans, Kevin Pollak Chat Show, Battleship Pretension, Sklarbro Country, Who Charted, and The 500 with Josh Adams Meyers.

From March 2015 until December 2017, Federman co-hosted the podcast Human Conversation with comedian Erin McGathy. McCarthy and Federman discussed various, oft-delightful, and meandering topics without the aid of technology. Human Conversation was suspended when McGathy moved to Ireland.

Federman launched a new podcast in September 2018 entitled, The History of Standup. Along with co-host Andrew Steven, the two chronicle the history of stand-up comedy from vaudeville to Netflix. In 2019 they completed a second season which focused on "venues, scenes, and events." Some guests who have appeared on The History of Standup include Margaret Cho, Mike Birbiglia, Tig Notaro, Lily Tomlin, Demetri Martin, Shecky Greene, Judd Apatow, Pete Holmes, Jimmy Pardo, journalist Julie Seabaugh, and comedy historian Kliph Nesteroff.

=== Producer ===
In 2018, Federman co-produced the Emmy-winning HBO documentary, The Zen Diaries of Garry Shandling. He produced an award-winning web series with Don Rickles entitled, Dinner With Don, as well as Apatow's 2017 Netflix stand-up special, The Return. In 2022, Federman produced the two-part HBO documentary George Carlin's American Dream.

=== Journalism ===
In November 2011, Federman wrote an article documenting Ronald Reagan's pivotal role during the SAG strike of 1960 which established residual payments for film actors. It was published in The Atlantic. In January 2013, he wrote an article on Pete Maravich's untimely death in 1987. Entitled "A Miracle Heart" the article was published by SLAM. In September 2015, He wrote a long-form article entitled "From Sullivan to CK: a History of Modern American Standup" for Splitsider, a magazine bought by New York Media in March 2018.

In 2016 Federman penned two articles for Vulture. One is about the enduring impact of comedian Richard Pryor's 1979 concert film, and the other references many comedy rooms which Federman played over 30-plus years performing stand-up comedy. In 2021 he wrote an article for Vulture entitled "The Wild Career of Jackie Mason."

=== The Chronicles of Federman ===
The Chronicles of Federman is a three-volume retrospective of rare audio recordings of Wayne Federman's stand-up career (1984–2015). It was produced by Aspecialthing Records, released in 2016, and the liner notes were written by Judd Apatow.

=== Professor at USC ===
In Spring 2017, Federman began his tenure as an adjunct professor at the University of Southern California in Los Angeles. He teaches level-2 stand-up performance and a critical studies course on the history of stand-up comedy for the USC School of Dramatic Arts.

== Filmography ==
=== Film and television ===
Year	Title	Role	Notes
2026	Life, Larry and the Pursuit of Unhappiness	Alfred	Episode 6 ("Buzz")
2025	Elsbeth	Jim	CBS Season 3, Episode 1 "Yes, And..."
2023	What We Do in the Shadows	Vampire Doctor	FX Season 5, Episode 6 "Urgent Care"
2023	Sweetwater	Referee Pete	Film - directed by Martin Guigui
2021	The Tonight Show Starring Jimmy Fallon	Self - Guest	5th Tonight Show appearance
2020	Silicon Valley	Stu	HBO Season 6, Episode 4 "Maximizing Alphaness"
2020	Bless This Mess	Lars	ABC Season 2, Episode 13 "Calm Down"
2020	Dummy	Stu - Sex Doll Repairman	Quibi Season 1, Episode 3 "Doll Parts"
2019	NCIS: Los Angeles	Eli	CBS Season 10, Episode 18 "Born to Run"
2019	Crashing	Wayne Federman	HBO Season 3, Episode 4 "The Viewing Party", Season 2, Episode 7 "Artie"
2018	Alone Together	Mr. Sears	FreeForm, Season 2, Episode 3 "Nurse Esther"
2018	Love	Todd	Netflix Season 3, Episode 3 "Arya and Greg"
2017	Transparent	Uncle Jerry	Amazon Season 4, Episode 1 "Standing Order" Directed by Joey Soloway
2017	Difficult People	Executive Producer	Hulu Season 3, Episode 1 "Passover Bump"
2017	The House	Chip Dave	Film - directed by Andrew J. Cohen
2017	Sandy Wexler	Eric Lamonsoff	Film (Netflix) - directed by Steve Brill
2016	Life in Pieces	Dr. Saul Antro (recurring)	CBS Season 2, Episode 3 "Eyebrow Anonymous Trapped Gem", Season 2, Episode 6 "Boxing Opinion Spider Beard"
2016	Punching Henry	Carl Rohmer	Film - directed by Gregory Viens
2016	Documentary Now!	Mark Weisel	IFC Season 2, Episode 1 "The Bunker"
2016	Comedy Bang! Bang!	Professor Blanyard	IFC Season 5, Episode 16 "Ben Folds Wears a Black Button Down and Jeans"
2016	Childrens Hospital	Dr. Reed	Adult Swim Season 7, Episode 6 "DOY"
2016	It's Always Sunny in Philadelphia	Mr. Sanderson	FX Season 12, Episode 9 "A Cricket's Tale"
2015	Being Canadian	Himself	Documentary - directed by Rob Cohen
2015	Community	Father	Yahoo Screen Season 6, Episode 13 "Emotional Consequences of Broadcast Television" Final Episode
2015	General Hospital	Justice of The Peace Fox	ABC Episode 13307 (live), Episode 13308
2015	New Girl	Ned	Fox Season 4, Episode 8 "Teachers"
2015	Shameless	Norman	Showtime Season 5, Episode 7 "Tell Me You F**king Need Me"
2014	Hello Ladies	Father	The Movie - directed by Stephen Merchant
2014	Married	Lane	FX Season 1, Episode 6 "Invisible Man"
2009	Funny People	Comedy and Magic Manager	Director - Judd Apatow
2009	Curb Your Enthusiasm	Dean Weinstock	Season 1, Episode 6 "The Wire" Episode 62, "Vehicular Fellatio"
2008	Step Brothers	Don (Blind Neighbor)	Director - Adam McKay
2008	Knocked Up	Baseball Fantasy Guy	Director - Judd Apatow
2007	Wizards of Waverly Place	Mr. Kaminsky	Disney Channel Season 1, Episode 2 "First Kiss"
2005	The 40-Year-Old Virgin	SmartTech Customer	Director - Judd Apatow
2005	Bam Bam and Celeste	Redneck	Director - Margaret Cho
2003	Charlie's Angels: Full Throttle	Bathroom Guy	Director - McG
2001	Legally Blonde	Harvard Admissions Board Member	Director - Robert Luketic
2000	The X-Files	Wayne Federman	FOX Season 7, Episode 19 "Hollywood A.D." written and directed by David Duchovny
1999	NewsRadio	Randy Stark	NBC Season 5, Episode 20 "Freaky Friday"
1998	The Wild Thornberrys	Various Roles	Animated Series
1998	The Larry Sanders Show	Stan Sanders	HBO Season 6, Episode 6 "Adolf Hankler"
1995	Living Single	Fred Meyer	FOX Season 2, Episodes 10,19 "Double Indignity" "Legal Briefs" Season 3, Episode 11 "Mommy Not Dearest"
1992	A Different World	A&M Wolf	NBC Season 5, Episode 14 "The Cat's in the Cradle"
1991	L.A. Law	TV Floor Manager	NBC Season 6, Episodes 2,7,15 "TV or Not TV" "Lose the Boss" "Great Balls Afire"
1990	WIOU	Singing Telegram Bear	CBS Season 1, Episode 1 "Pilot"
1990	Dear John	Paul	NBC Season 2, Episode 16 "Some Night to Remember"
1989	Parent Trap: Hawaiian Honeymoon	The Messenger	4th and final installment of the original Parent Trap series

== Other television appearances ==
- Newsreaders (2014) Cartoon Network
- The Neighbors (2013) ABC
- American Dad! (2012) FOX
- The League (2011) FXX
- Running Wilde (2010) FOX
- Late Night with Jimmy Fallon (2009) NBC
- Kathy Griffin: My Life on the D-List (2009) Bravo
- Head Case (2008) Starz
- Heist (2006) NBC
- Courting Alex (2006) CBS
- Cheap Seats (2006) ESPN Classic
- King of the Hill (2005) FOX
- Comedy Central Presents (2004) Comedy Central
- Tough Crowd with Colin Quinn (2003) Comedy Central
- Oliver Beene (2003) FOX
- The Late Late Show with Craig Kilborn (2002) CBS
- Late Friday (2001) NBC
- The Sports List (2001) Fox Sports Networks
- D.O.A. (1997) Unaired Christopher Guest HBO Pilot
- Make Me Laugh (1997) Comedy Central
- The New Adventures of Robin Hood (1997) TNT
- The Improv Presents: Don't Quit Your Day Job (1996), game
- Almost Home (1993) NBC
- Doogie Howser, M.D. (1993) ABC
- Amen (TV series) (1991) NBC
- Baywatch (1990) NBC
- Comedy Tonight (1986) PBS

== Music Videos ==
- Aerosmith - Love in an Elevator (1989) - audience
- Eels - Rags To Rags (1997) - game show host

== Discography ==
- The Chronicles of Federman (2016) Aspecialthing Records

== Documentaries ==
- Uninterrupted: Real Stories of Basketball - Pistol Pete Maravich (2024) Vice
- Right to Offend: The Black Comedy Revolution (2022) A&E
- We Need to Talk About Cosby (2022) Showtime
- The Story of Late Night (2021) CNN
- The History of Comedy (2018) CNN
- SEC Storied Maravich (2018) ESPN
- I Am Battle Comic (2017)
- Comedy Road (2017)
- Reagan: From Movie Star to President (2017) Reelz
- Misery Loves Comedy (2016)
- Being Canadian (2015)
- I Am Road Comic (2014)
- Eat, Drink, Laugh: The Story of The Comic Strip (2013)
- I Am Comic (2009)
- Pistol Pete: The Life and Times of Pete Maravich (2001) CBS
- SportsCentury (2001) ESPN

== Works ==
- Federman, Wayne (15 March 2021). The History of Stand-Up: From Mark Twain to Dave Chappelle (2021). Amazon Digital Services LLC - KDP Print US. ISBN 979-8706637026.
- Federman, Wayne; Terrill, Marshall (2008). MARAVICH: The Authorized Biography of Pistol Pete (2009). Tyndale House Publishers. ISBN 978-1589975354.
