= Marion Butler Birthplace =

Historic house in North Carolina, United States

- U.S. National Register of Historic Places
- Location within North Carolina Location within the United States
- Location: NC 242 at SR 1414, near Salemburg, North Carolina
- Coordinates: 35°02′25″N 78°27′59″W
- Area: 45 acres (18 ha)
- Built: c. 1860
- MPS: Sampson County MRA
- NRHP reference No.: 86000552
- Added to NRHP: March 17, 1986

Marion Butler Birthplace is a historic home located near Salemburg, Sampson County, North Carolina. It was built about 1860, and is a one-story, double-pile plan, frame farmhouse. It has a low hipped roof, three-bay hipped porch, and has a later rear ell. It was the birthplace of Marion Butler (1863–1938), North Carolina politician and chairman of the national Populist party in 1896. It was moved in 1991.

It was added to the National Register of Historic Places in 1986.
