= Howard-Royal House =

Historic house in North Carolina, United States

- U.S. National Register of Historic Places
- Location within North Carolina Location within the United States
- Location: 202 N. Main St., Salemburg, North Carolina, U.S.
- Coordinates: 35°0′58″N 78°30′12″W
- Area: less than one acre
- Built: 1892
- MPS: Sampson County MRA
- NRHP reference No.: 86000561
- Added to NRHP: March 17, 1986

Howard-Royal House is a historic home located at Salemburg, North Carolina, United States. It was built in 1892, and is a two-story, three bay by one bay, single pile, frame dwelling with a rear ell. It has a gable roof and a central two-tier porch flanked by two-story, octagonal bay windows. Also on the property is a contributing shed.

It was added to the National Register of Historic Places in 1986.
