= USS Iwo Jima (LHD-7) =

U.S. Navy amphibious assault ship

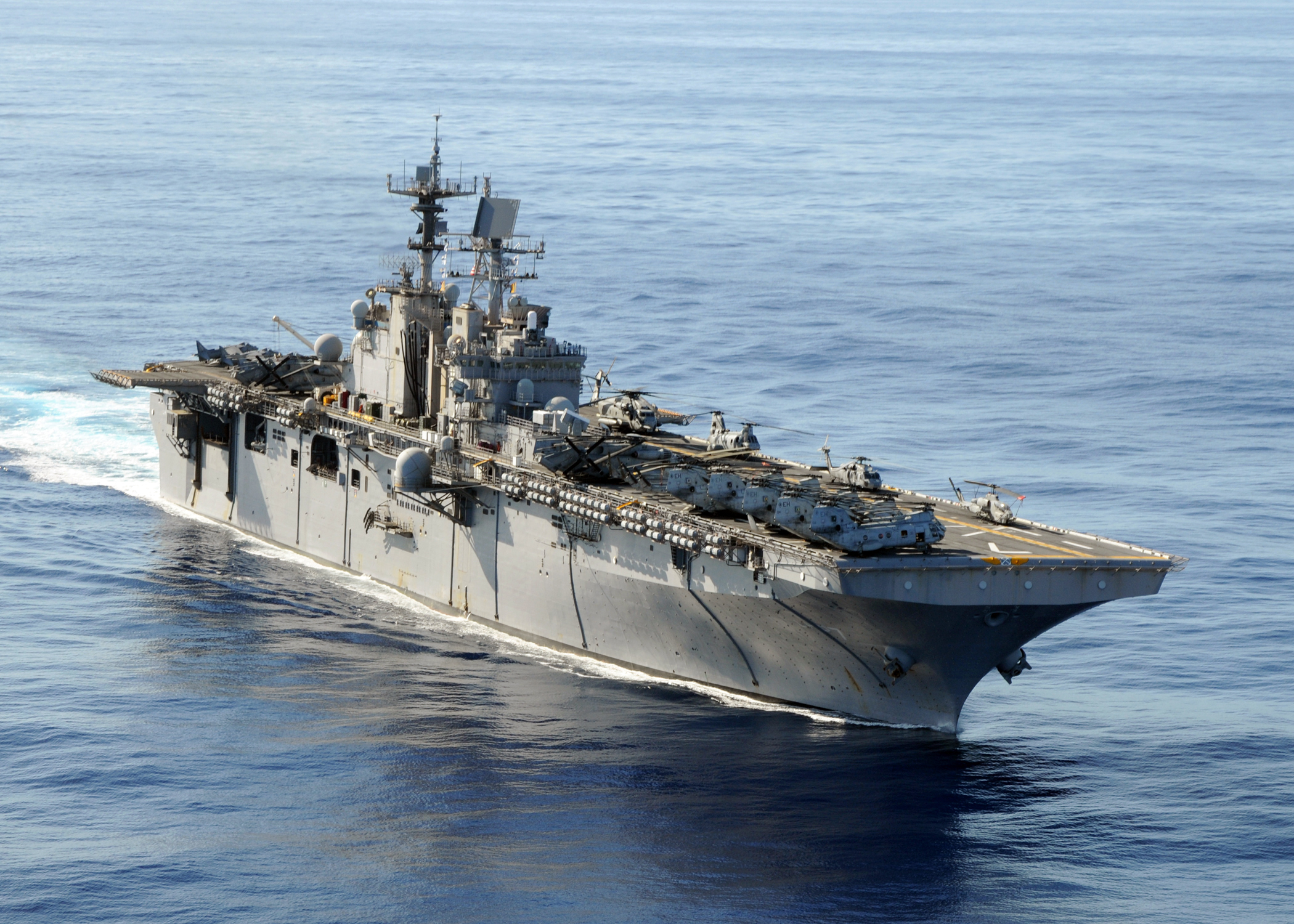
- USS Iwo Jima transits the Atlantic Ocean on 6 September 2008

History

United States
- Name: Iwo Jima
- Namesake: Battle of Iwo Jima
- Ordered: 28 February 1995
- Builder: Ingalls Shipbuilding
- Laid down: 12 December 1997
- Launched: 4 February 2000
- Sponsored by: Zandra Krulak
- Christened: 25 March 2000
- Commissioned: 30 June 2001
- Home port: Naval Station Norfolk
- Identification: MMSI number: 338813000; Callsign: NXXG; Hull number: LHD-7
- Motto: Uncommon Valor
- Status: in active service
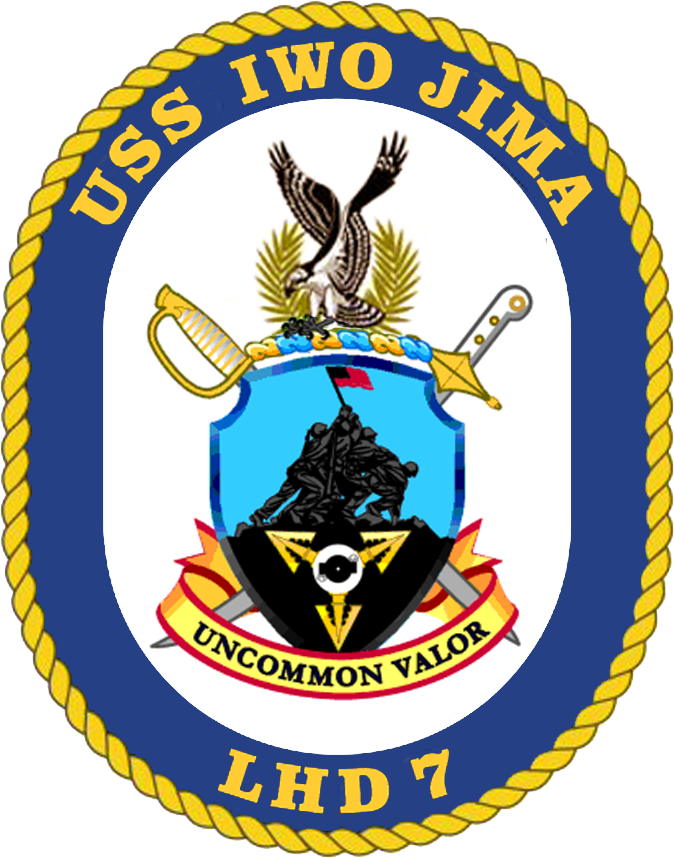
- Badge

General characteristics
- Type: Wasp-class amphibious assault ship
- Displacement: 40,500 long tons (41,150 t) full load
- Length: 843 ft (257 m)
- Beam: 104 ft (31.8 m)
- Draft: 27 ft (8.1 m)
- Propulsion: Two boilers, two geared steam turbines, two shafts, 70,000 shp (52,000 kW);
- Speed: 22 knots (41 km/h; 25 mph)
- Range: 9,500 nautical miles (17,600 km; 10,900 mi) at 18 kn (33 km/h; 21 mph)
- Well deck dimensions: 266-by-50-foot (81 by 15.2 m) by 28-foot (8.5 m) high
- Boats & landing craft carried: 3 Landing Craft Air Cushion or; 2 Landing Craft Utility or; 12 Landing Craft Mechanized
- Troops: 1,687 troops (plus 184 surge) Marine Detachment
- Complement: 1,208
- Sensors & processing systems: 1 AN/SPS-49 2-D Air Search Radar; 1 AN/SPS-48 3-D Air Search Radar; 1 AN/SPS-67 Surface Search Radar; 1 Mk23 Target Acquisition System (TAS); 1 AN/SPN-43 Marshalling Air Traffic Control Radar; 1 AN/SPN-35 Air Traffic Control Radar; 1 AN/URN-25 TACAN system; 1 AN/UPX-24 Identification Friend or Foe
- Armament: Two RIM-116 Rolling Airframe Missile launchers; Two RIM-7 Sea Sparrow missile launchers; Two 20 mm Phalanx CIWS systems; Three 25 mm Mk 38 chain guns; Four .50 BMG machine guns
- Aircraft carried: Actual mix depends on the mission; Standard Complement: 6 AV-8B Harrier II attack aircraft; or; 6 F-35B Lightning II stealth strike-fighters; 4 AH-1W /Z Super Cobra /Viper attack helicopter; 12 MV-22B Osprey assault support tiltrotor; 4 CH-53E Super Stallion heavy-lift helicopters; 3–4 UH-1Y Venom utility helicopters; Assault: 22+ MV-22B Osprey assault support tiltrotor; Sea Control: 20 AV-8B Harrier II attack aircraft; or; 20 F-35B Lightning II stealth strike-fighters; 6 SH-60F/HH-60H ASW helicopters

USS Iwo Jima (LHD-7) is a Wasp-class amphibious assault ship of the United States Navy. The ship was named for the Battle of Iwo Jima of World War II. The ship was commissioned in 2001 and is in service.

== Construction and career ==
Fabrication work for Iwo Jima began at Ingalls shipyard on 3 September 1996, and the ship's keel was laid on 12 December 1997. At the keel laying ceremony, United States Army Captain Jacklyn H. Lucas, who was awarded the Medal of Honor for his actions while serving as a Marine at the Battle of Iwo Jima, placed his Medal of Honor citation in the hull of the ship, where it remains today. She was launched on 4 February 2000. USS Iwo Jima was christened by her sponsor, Zandra Krulak, wife of General Charles C. Krulak, the former Commandant of the Marine Corps, in Pascagoula, Mississippi, on 25 March 2000. The commissioning crew moved aboard in April 2001, and made the ship's maiden voyage on 23 June 2001, accompanied by more than 2,000 World War II veterans – many of them survivors of the Battle of Iwo Jima. She was commissioned a week later in Pensacola, Florida, on 30 June 2001.

Shortly thereafter, the ship and crew began an accelerated Inter Deployment Training Cycle, which tested virtually every system on board in realistic combat conditions. Iwo Jima was also the first ship on the waterfront open to the public after the terrorist attacks of 11 September 2001. In 2002, Iwo Jima participated in Fleet Week in New York City.

== Ship's history ==
=== 2003 ===
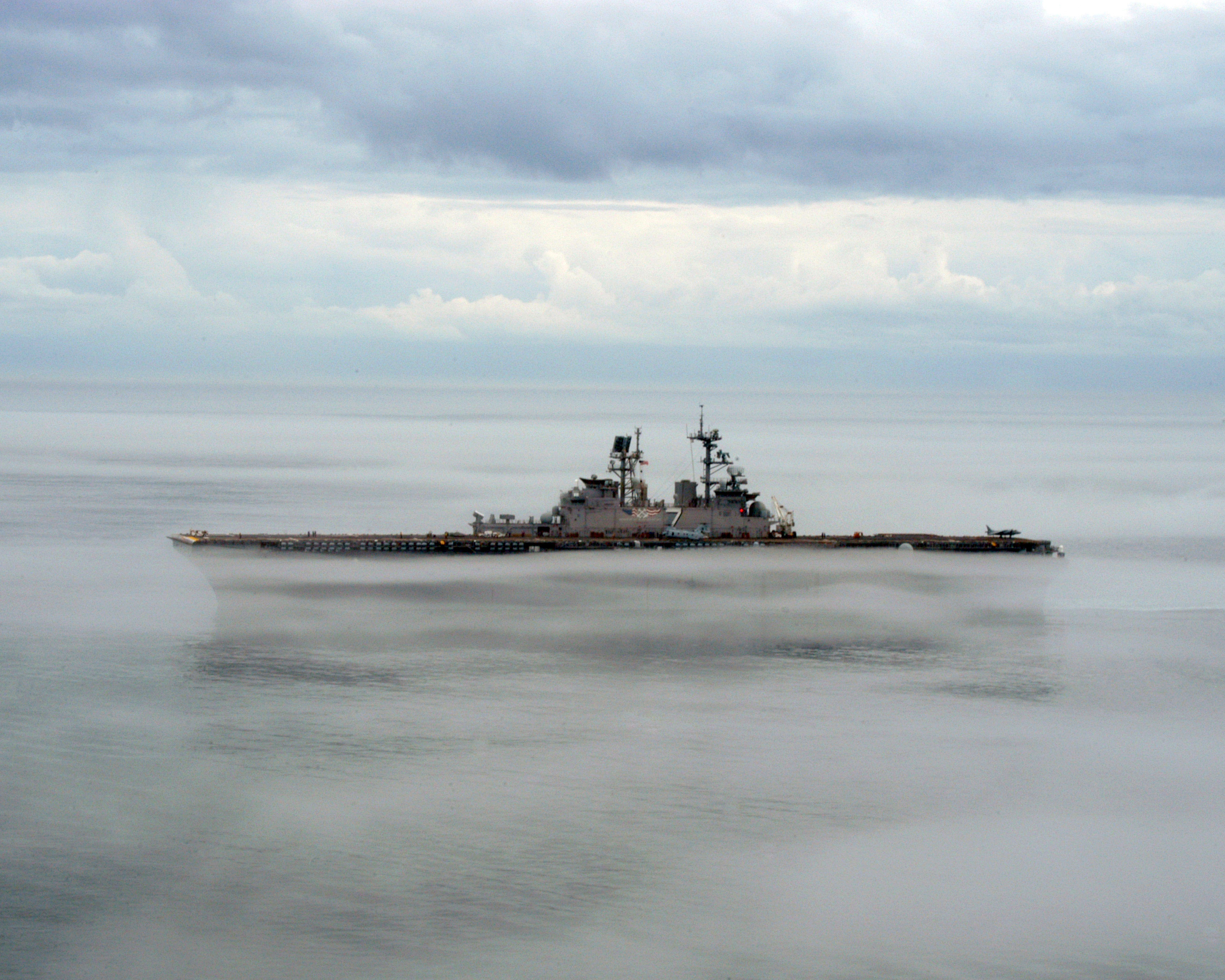
Iwo Jima operating in fog in the Atlantic Ocean

Iwo Jima and the Marines of the 26th Marine Expeditionary Unit (26 MEU) along with two other amphibious assault ships formed the Iwo Jima Amphibious Ready Group. Iwo Jima left port on 4 March 2003 in support of Operation Enduring Freedom and deployed Marines in April 2003 from the Mediterranean Sea into Northern Iraq for the Iraq War. In July 2003, Iwo Jima deployed to the coast of Liberia as part of JTF Liberia in response to the Second Liberian Civil War. During this operation, the Southern European Task Force (SETAF) served as the command element of JTF Liberia and Iwo Jima with the 26 MEU landed Marines in Liberia to perform humanitarian assessments. "At its height, JTF Liberia consisted of over 5,000 service members from the SETAF headquarters, the 26th Marine Expeditionary Unit, the three-ship Iwo Jima Amphibious Ready Group, 3rd Air Force's 398th Air Expeditionary Group, U.S. Army Europe's 21st Theater Support Command, and Army Special Forces."

=== 2004–2005 ===
In 2004, Iwo Jima participated in Fleet Week. Iwo Jima served as the 2nd Fleet flagship in 2005, based out of Norfolk, Virginia.

=== Hurricane Katrina ===
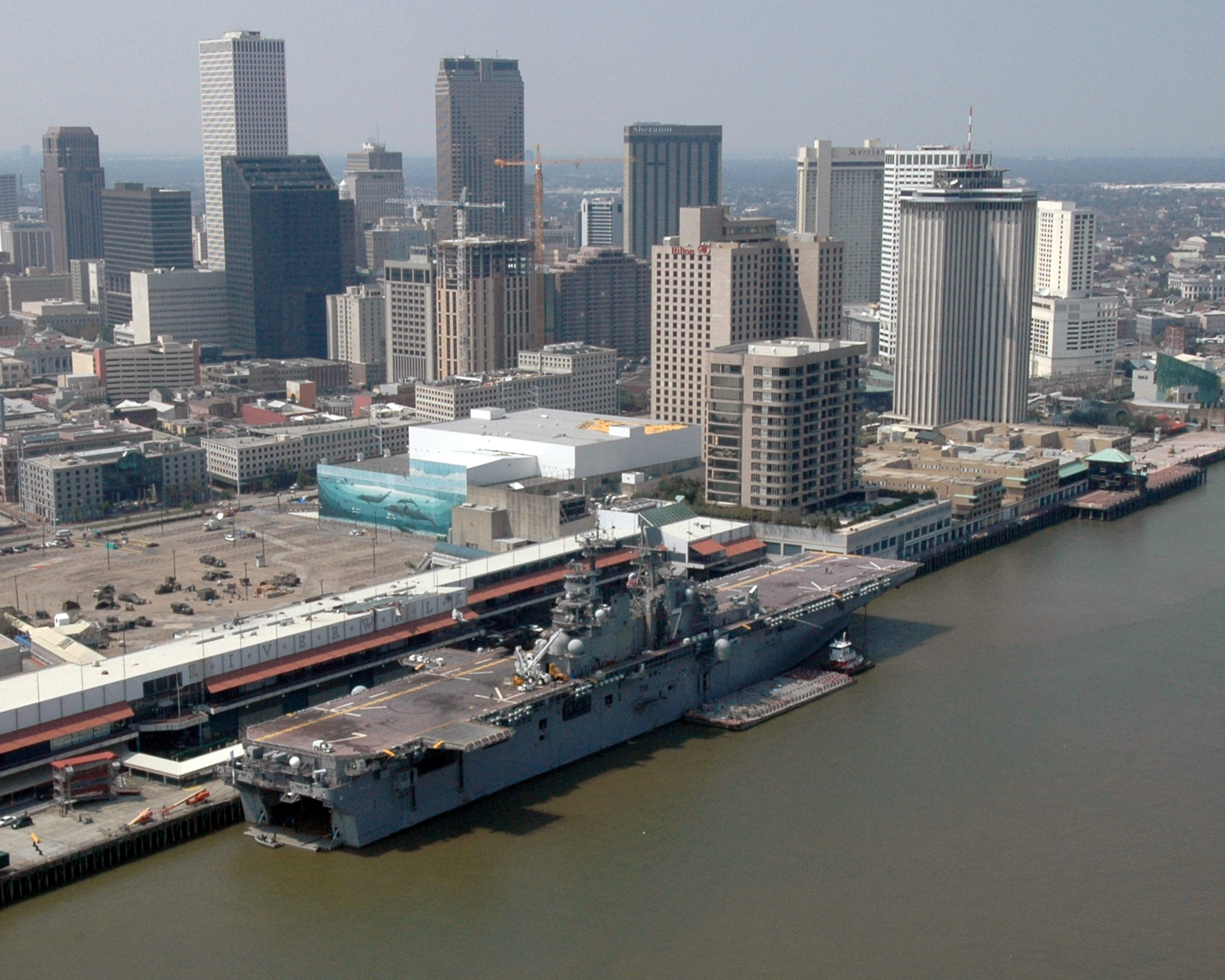
USS Iwo Jima pier side in New Orleans

On 31 August 2005, Iwo Jima was sortied to the Gulf of Mexico to provide disaster relief and to conduct support operations in the wake of Hurricane Katrina. Iwo Jima sailed up the Mississippi River to the city of New Orleans to directly support relief operations and act as the central command center for all federal, state and local disaster recovery operations.

During this critical period, Iwo Jima also served as the region's only fully functional air field for helicopter operations, conducting over one thousand flight deck operations; provided hot meals, showers, drinking water, and berthing to thousands of National Guardsmen and relief workers; provided medical services, including first aid and surgical services, for disaster victims; and conducted clean-up operations in the city and suburbs of New Orleans.

Iwo Jima served as flagship for the commander-in-chief, George W. Bush, during Hurricane Katrina Joint Task Force, and is only the second Navy ship to have been presented the flag of the president of the United States.

=== 2006 ===
On 6 June 2006, Iwo Jima left her homeport of Norfolk, Virginia, and began a regularly scheduled six-month deployment to the U.S. European Command and U.S. Central Command area of responsibilities, as flagship for the Iwo Jima Expeditionary Strike Group, encompassing 6,000 sailors and Marines. The ship was also a part of the evacuation effort of American citizens from the conflict in Lebanon.

News reports on 15 July 2006 stated that Iwo Jima, flagship of the 24th Marine Expeditionary Unit, would be used to evacuate U. S. citizens from Lebanon after the Israeli Defense Force made Beirut International Airport unusable through bombing its runways and fuel storage areas.

=== 2007 ===
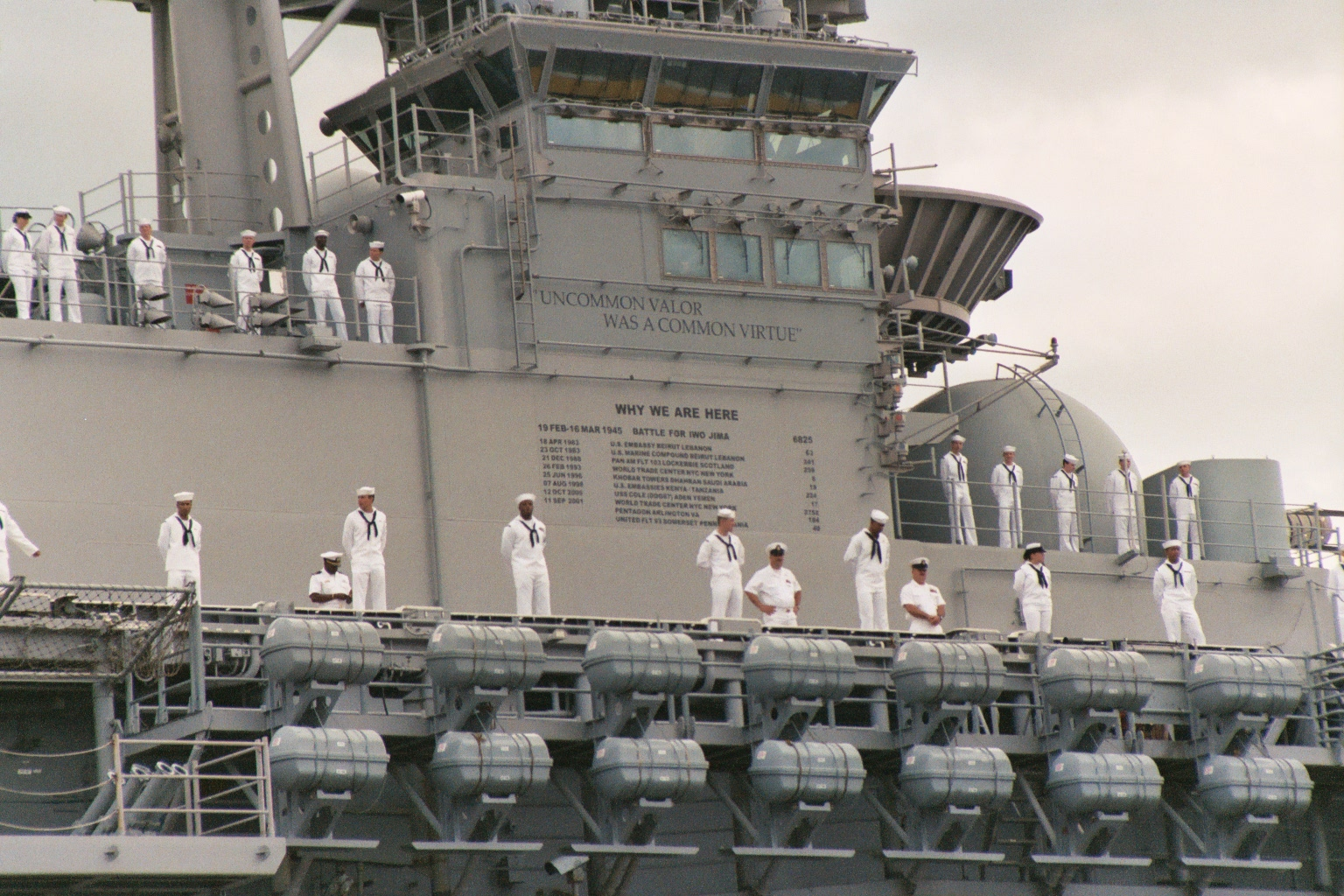
A close-up of the ship's motto, "Uncommon Valor", Portland, Maine, 2 July 2005

On 16 February 2007, Iwo Jima was awarded the 2006 Battle "E" award.

=== 2009–2012 ===
In 2009, 2010, and 2011, Iwo Jima participated at the annual Fleet Week in New York City.

On 3 November 2010, Iwo Jima was deployed to Haiti in anticipation of providing humanitarian assistance due to an impending Tropical Storm Tomas.

On 27 March 2012, Iwo Jima was deployed as part of the Iwo Jima Amphibious Ready Group with Marines from the 24th Marine Expeditionary Unit supporting maritime security operations and security cooperation efforts in the U.S. 5th and 6th Fleet areas of responsibility.

On 11 April 2012, an MV-22 from VMM-261 crashed near Agadir, Morocco, during a joint training exercise after taking off from USS Iwo Jima. Two US Marine crew chiefs were killed and the two pilots were seriously injured.

Early in May 2012, Iwo Jima was operating in the Gulf of Aqaba and in the south of the Red Sea. In November 2012, Iwo Jima was dispatched to the eastern Mediterranean, during escalating warfare between Israel and Hamas, in case the evacuation of U.S. citizens from Israel was required, delaying the scheduled return of Iwo Jima to Norfolk.

=== 2014 ===
In August 2014, Iwo Jima changed her homeport to Mayport.

=== 2015 ===
In January 2015, Iwo Jima, USS Fort McHenry and USS New York were positioned off the coast of Yemen on standby to evacuate the staff of the US embassy if the situation had arisen, due to the collapse of the Yemeni government.

=== 2016 ===
In October 2016, Iwo Jima sailed to Haiti to relieve USS Mesa Verde, assisting victims of Hurricane Matthew.

=== 2018 ===
In October and November 2018, Iwo Jima participated in NATO's Exercise Trident Juncture 2018 in Norway.

=== 2021 ===
In December 2021, Iwo Jima changed homeports from Naval Station Mayport to Naval Station Norfolk as a part of the Navy's plan to consolidate the East Coast-based amphibious ships to the Norfolk area.

=== 2025 ===
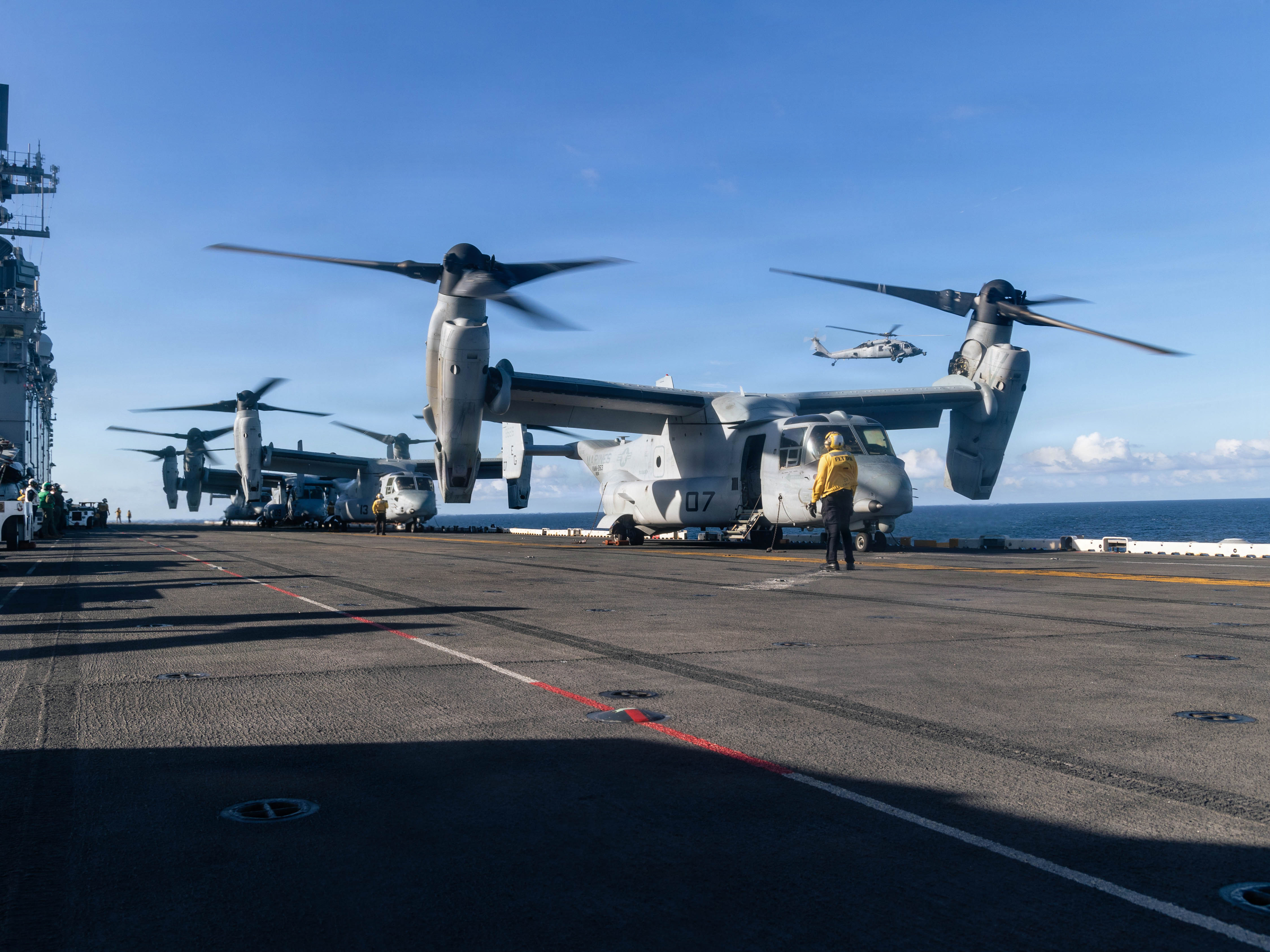
Marine Units aboard USS Iwo Jima during Operation Southern Spear

Iwo Jima departed Norfolk base on 14 August with around 4,500 Marines embarked from the 22nd Marine Expeditionary unit alongside the USS Fort Lauderdale and USS San Antonio and two destroyers as a part of the Iwo Jima Amphibious Ready Group to the South Caribbean as a deployment for Operation Southern Spear. A live-firing exercise was conducted by the ARG in November, off the coast of Venezuela.

=== 2026 ===
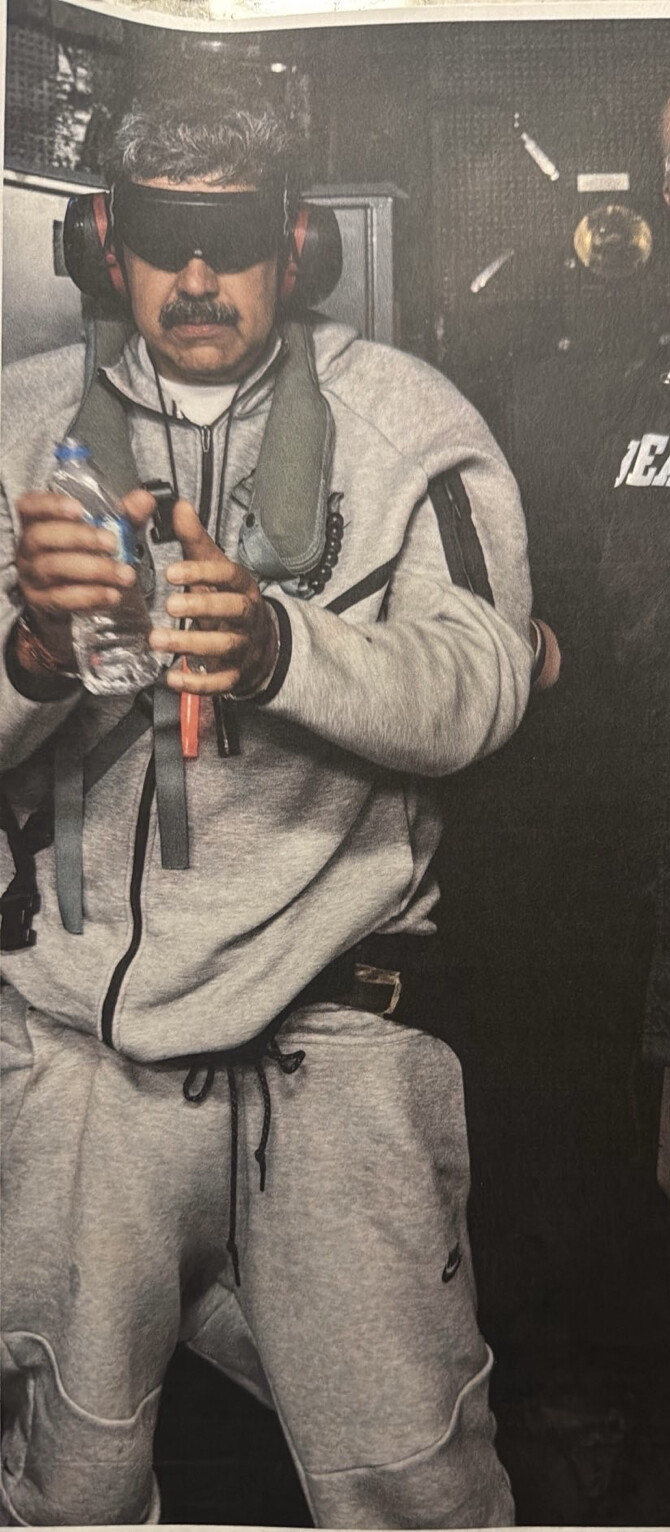
Nicolas Maduro on board the USS Iwo Jima

On 3 January 2026, the United States launched strikes in Venezuela, resulting in the capture of President Nicolás Maduro and First Lady Cilia Flores. President Donald Trump subsequently posted an image of Maduro on Truth Social with the caption "Nicolas Maduro on board the USS Iwo Jima." According to initial reporting and later confirmed by General Dan Caine in a press conference, the president and first lady were taken into custody aboard the Iwo Jima, during Operation Absolute Resolve.

== Awards ==
- Humanitarian Service Medal – 2016; Hurricane Matthew, 2017; Hurricane Irma
- Admiral James Flatley Memorial Award for Naval Aviation Safety – 2003, 2015, 2018, 2021

== Motto ==
The ship's motto, "Uncommon Valor", is based on Fleet Admiral Chester W. Nimitz's words when he spoke of Sailors and Marines who fought at Iwo Jima: "Among the Americans who served on Iwo Jima, uncommon valor was a common virtue."
