= Salemburg, North Carolina =

- Town
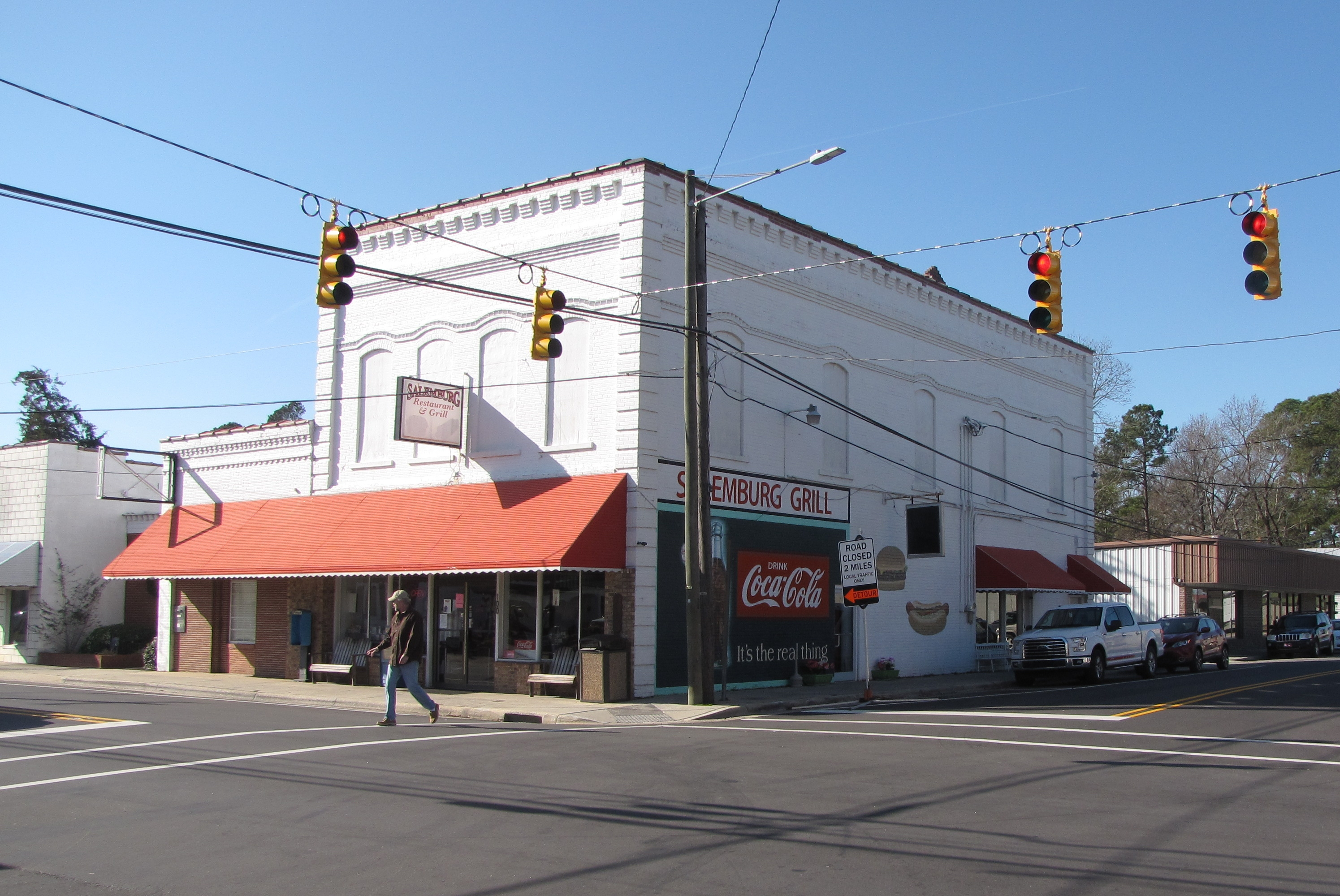
- Salemburg Grill on Main Street

- Location within the state of North Carolina
- Coordinates: 35°00′54″N 78°30′10″W
- Country: United States
- State: North Carolina
- County: Sampson

Area
  - Total: 0.98 sq mi (2.53 km^{2})
  - Land: 0.98 sq mi (2.53 km^{2})
  - Water: 0 sq mi (0.00 km^{2})
- Elevation: 167 ft (51 m)

Population (2020)
  - Total: 457
  - Density: 468.6/sq mi (180.91/km^{2})
- Time zone: UTC-5 (Eastern (EST))
  - Summer (DST): UTC-4 (EDT)
- ZIP code: 28385
- Area codes: 910, 472
- FIPS code: 37-58840
- GNIS feature ID: 2407276
- Website: www.salemburg-nc.com

Salemburg is a town in Sampson County, North Carolina, United States. The population was 457 at the 2020 census.

== History ==
The town incorporated as Salemburg in 1905.

Salemburg was the home of the former Southwood College. The North Carolina Justice Academy operates out of the former college. The academy, a training institution of the North Carolina Department of Justice, has a staff of 82.

The Marion Butler Birthplace and Howard-Royal House were added to the National Register of Historic Places in 1986.

== Geography ==
According to the United States Census Bureau, the town has a total area of 1.0 square miles (2.6 km^{2}), all land.

Salemburg is located on NC 242, between US Route 421 and NC 24. The community is located 12 miles west of Clinton, 20 miles west of Interstate 40, and 20 miles east of Interstate 95.

== Demographics ==
Historical population
Census	Pop.	Note	%±
1920	215		—
1930	318		47.9%
1940	371		16.7%
1950	435		17.3%
1960	569		30.8%
1970	669		17.6%
1980	742		10.9%
1990	409		−44.9%
2000	469		14.7%
2010	435		−7.2%
2020	457		5.1%
U.S. Decennial Census

As of the census of 2000, there were 469 people, 218 households, and 139 families residing in the town. The population density was 469.1 people per square mile (181.1 people/km^{2}). There were 252 housing units at an average density of 252.0 per square mile (97.3/km^{2}). The racial makeup of the town was 88.91% White, 7.89% African American, 1.07% Native American, 0.21% Asian, 0.85% from other races, and 1.07% from two or more races. Hispanic or Latino of any race were 3.41% of the population.

There were 218 households, out of which 22.0% had children under the age of 18 living with them, 50.5% were married couples living together, 9.6% had a female householder with no husband present, and 35.8% were non-families. 33.5% of all households were made up of individuals, and 18.8% had someone living alone who was 65 years of age or older. The average household size was 2.14 and the average family size was 2.70.

In the town, the population was spread out, with 18.8% under the age of 18, 5.3% from 18 to 24, 24.7% from 25 to 44, 23.9% from 45 to 64, and 27.3% who were 65 years of age or older. The median age was 46 years. For every 100 females, there were 87.6 males. For every 100 females age 18 and over, there were 85.9 males.

The median income for a household in the town was $34,886, and the median income for a family was $45,833. Males had a median income of $36,250 versus $21,923 for females. The per capita income for the town was $18,536. About 0.7% of families and 6.0% of the population were below the poverty line, including none of those under age 18 and 12.7% of those age 65 or over.

In 2023, the population estimate for Salemburg was 486.

== Notable people ==
- William R. King (1786–1853), Vice President of the United States under Franklin Pierce was from the Suttontown area of Sampson Co.
- Jacklyn H. Lucas (1928–2008), Medal of Honor recipient
- Willie Weeks (born 1947), former bassist for The Doobie Brothers
