= Southwood College =

Former college in North Carolina, United States

Coordinates: 35.0165°N 78.5072°W

Southwell College
- Former names: Pineland Junior College (1926–1965); Edwards Military Institute (1935–1965)
- Type: Private two-year college
- Active: 1965–1973
- Location: Salemburg, North Carolina, United States

Southwood College was a private two-year college founded in 1965 in Salemburg, North Carolina and closed in 1973. For many years, two schools, Edwards Military Institute and Pineland College, operated on the same site; on July 1, 1965, the institutions officially became Southwood College.

== History ==
The history of Southwood College began in 1875. Isham Royal founded Salemburg Academy, a one-room, private educational institution for girls. Private academies such as Salemburg flourished before the widespread introduction of public schools. One of the first principals was Marion Butler, later U.S. senator from North Carolina. In 1914, the program reorganized as the Pineland School for Girls following receipt of a donation of $70,000 from Benjamin N. Duke, son of Washington Duke, namesake of Duke University, and a commensurate contribution from local citizens

In 1926, the curriculum was broadened, several more buildings constructed, and the library expanded. The school became Pineland Junior College and served as a female only institution. The Edwards Military Institute, was added and was named for Methodist minister Anderson Edwards, who had contributed his life savings to the construction of the military academy.

In 1952, the schools had the youngest college president in the United States, Willard Jackson Blanchard, a World War II veteran, who at the time was thirty-two years old.

On July 1, 1965, the two schools merged and became Southwood College. The school closed its doors in 1973. That year, the North Carolina Department of Justice took over the grounds, and developed the North Carolina Justice Academy for the training of North Carolina criminal justice officers. The North Carolina Justice Academy still utilizes the Blanchard Learning Resource Center, the Royal Classroom Building, the Jones Auditorium, a cafeteria and an office building that were originally part of Southwood College.

Names Through the Years
Salem Academy/Salem High School	1874-1905
Salemburg Academy/Salemburg High School	1905-1914
Pineland School for Girls	1914-1924
Pineland Junior College	1924-1965
Edwards Memorial School	1933-1935
Edwards Military Institute	1935-1965
Southwood College	1965-1973

== Administration ==
Principals, Headmasters, and Presidents of Southwood College and its predecessors
Isham T. Royall	1875–1886
Marion F. Butler	1886–1889
Major George Edwin Butler	1889–1892
William Edward Darden	1892–1893
Alexander Franklin Howard	1893–1895
Rev. William Charles Barrett	1895–1898
Rev. Franklin T. Wooten	1898–1899
John J. Hendren/George Franklin Edwards	1899–1900
George Franklin Edwards/ Mollie Roberts Edwards	1902–1907
Mr. Claude C. Howard/Mrs. George Franklin Edwards	1907–1908
William Jackson Jones/Mollie Roberts Edwards Jones	1908–1945
William Jackson Jones	1945–1949
Willard Jackson Blanchard	1949–1957
Robert Burnes Isner	1957–1958
Joseph Davis Farrar	1958–1959
Robert Burnes Isner	1959–1962
Willard Jackson Blanchard	1962–1972
