= Comedy Tonight (PBS series) =

American comedy television series

Comedy Tonight was a standup comedy showcase broadcast by PBS from 1981 to 1991. Over 40 episodes broadcast on KQED between 1982 and 1991 are held by the American Archive of Public Broadcasting. The earliest of these features Alex Bennett, Whoopi Goldberg, Lorenzo Matawaran (Buzz Belmondo), and Barry Sobel; the latest Ellen DeGeneres, Susan Norfleet, and Bob Hartman.
