= Dan E. Caison Sr. House =

Historic house in North Carolina, United States

- U.S. National Register of Historic Places
- Location within North Carolina Location within the United States
- Location: Broad St., Roseboro, North Carolina
- Coordinates: 34°57′11″N 78°30′53″W
- Area: 1 acre (0.40 ha)
- Built: 1924
- Built by: Bryant, George; Sutton, Tom
- Architectural style: Bungalow/craftsman
- MPS: Sampson County MRA
- NRHP reference No.: 86001124
- Added to NRHP: May 21, 1986

Dan E. Caison Sr. House is a historic home located at Roseboro, Sampson County, North Carolina. The house was built in 1924, and is a two-story, Bungalow / American Craftsman style frame dwelling. It has a gable roof with exposed projecting rafters and triangular brackets, porte cochere, and a wrap-around porch with an intersecting gable roof. Also on the property are the contributing garage and small maid's house.

It was added to the National Register of Historic Places in 1986.
