= Cointet-element =

Mobile anti-tank obstacle

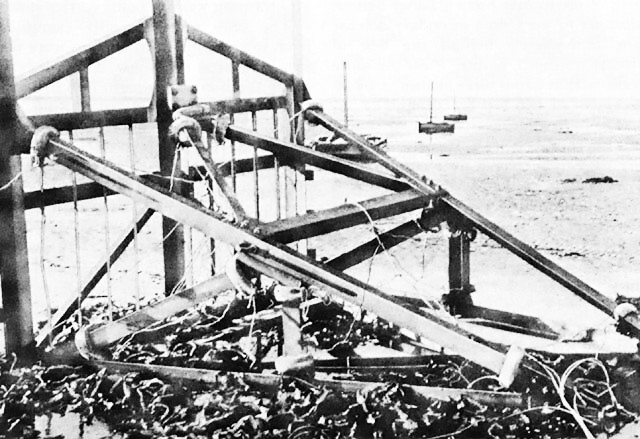
A Cointet-element on a beach, rigged with explosive "sausages" by an American Underwater Demolition Team.

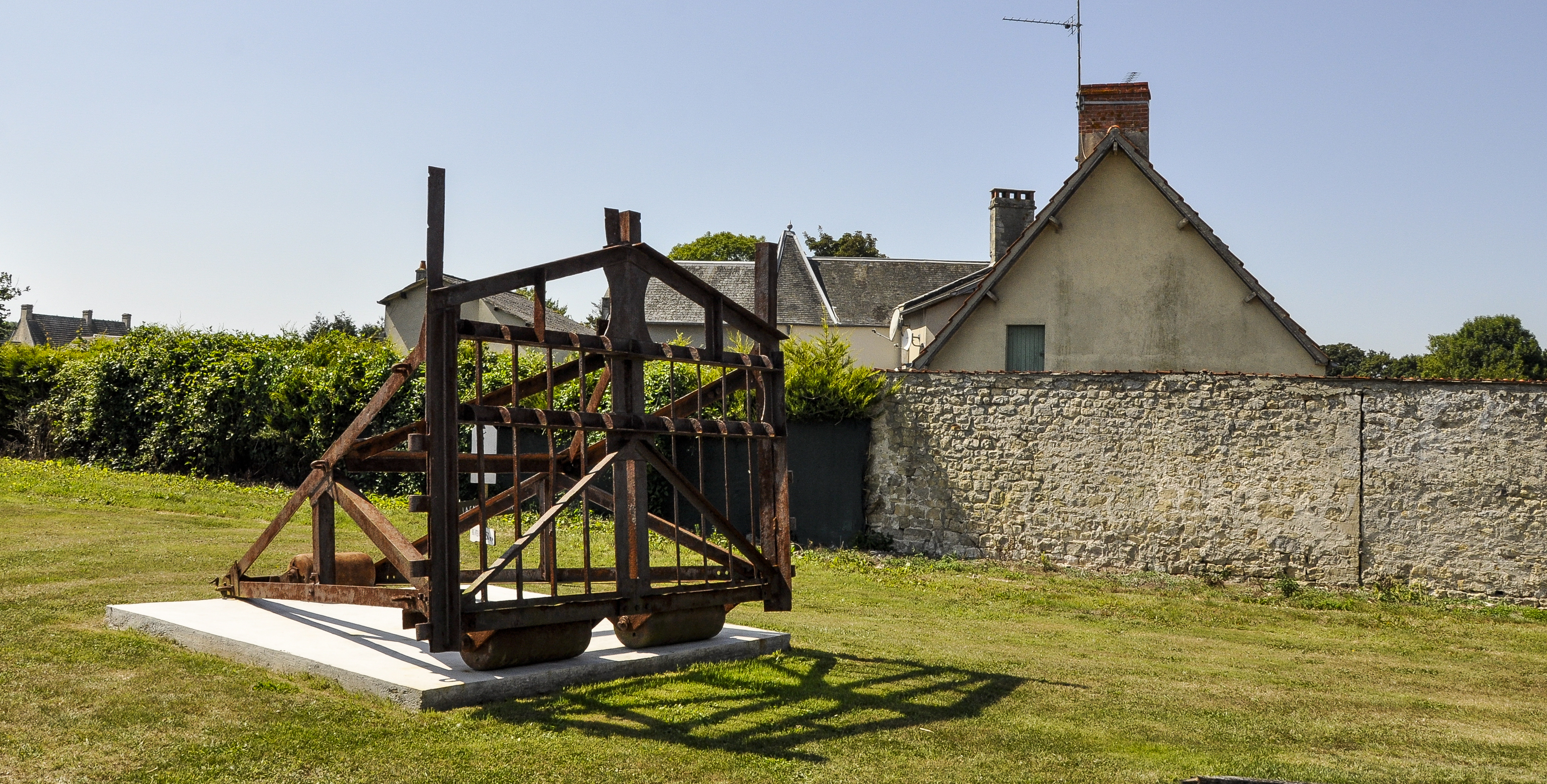
Cointet-element at Colleville-sur-Mer

The Cointet-element, also known as a Belgian Gate or C-element, was a heavy steel fence about three metres (9 ft 10 in) wide and two metres (6 ft 7 in) high, typically mounted on concrete rollers, used as a mobile anti-tank obstacle during World War II. Each individual fence element weighed about 1,280 kg (2,820 lb) and was movable (e.g. with two horses) through the use of two fixed and one rotating roller. Its invention is attributed to a French colonel (later general), Léon-Edmond de Cointet de Fillain who came up with the idea in 1933 to be used in the Maginot Line. Besides their use as barricades to the entrances of forts, bridges and roads, the heavy fences were used in the Belgian "Iron Wall" of the Koningshooikt–Wavre Line (also known as "Dyle Line") and were re-used as beach obstacles on the Atlantic Wall defending Normandy from Allied invasion.

== History ==
The Cointet-element formed the main barricade of the Belgian K-W Line, a tank barricade that was built between September 1939 and May 1940. Following tests, the Belgian Army accepted the Cointet-elements in 1936 after slightly altering the design by the addition of eight vertical beams in the front frame to stop infantry moving through them. On 13 February 1939 and 24 July 1939 the first tenders were called for ten groups of five hundred Cointets each. A total of 77,000 pieces were ordered by the Belgian Ministry of Defence and produced by twenty-eight Belgian companies with 73,600 delivered.

Thousands of Cointets were installed on the K-W Line between the village of Koningshooikt and the city of Wavre to act as the main line of defence against a possible German armoured invasion through the heartland of Belgium, forming a long iron wall. The Cointet-elements were placed next to each other in a zig-zag and connected with steel cables. Near main roads they were fixed to heavy concrete pillars set into the ground to allow local traffic passage. By May 1940 due to a relocation programme, the elements did not form a continuous line and thus were easily bypassed by the 3rd Panzer Division and 4th Panzer Division.

The Cointet elements were also used as an anti-tank line in a side branch of the K-W Line, which was meant to defend the southern approaches to Brussels. This line branched off the main line in Wavre and ran from there to Halle and on to Ninove, where it ended on the banks of the Dender.

After the German victory in Belgium on 28 May 1940, the Belgian Gates were reallocated across Europe to serve as barricade elements on roads, bridges and beaches. The Germans gave it the name C-element. Large numbers of gates were brought to Normandy during the construction of the Atlantikwall to be used with the other varieties of beach obstacles. Instead of connecting them, the Germans used them singly next to other items, especially at the low tide line. They were also put on the dikes next to bunkers. Notes from 1944 cite the placement of 23,408 Cointets over 4,340 km (2,700 mi) of coast. With many more still present in Belgium after D-Day, the Allies had great difficulty passing them in the last months of the war.

== See also ==
- Cheval de frise
- Czech hedgehog
- Dragon's teeth
