= Underwater Demolition Badge =

Obsolete badge of the United States Navy

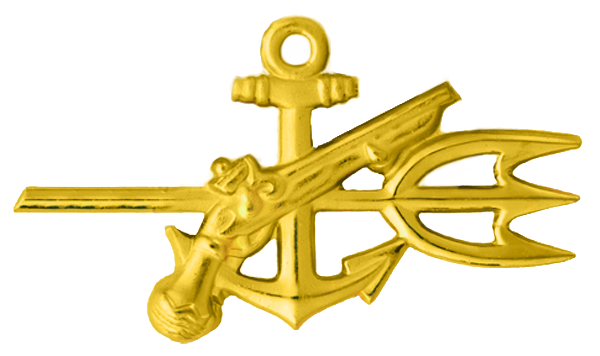
Underwater Demolition Badge

The Underwater Demolition Badge is an obsolete badge of the United States Navy which was first created during the Second World War. The Underwater Demolition Badge was established as a decoration for members of Navy Underwater Demolition Teams (UDTs) and is considered a predecessor decoration to the modern day Special Warfare Badge.

The Underwater Demolition Badge was originally worn as a patch on the upper sleeve of a Navy uniform. The badge was awarded to the members of the U.S. Navy Underwater Demolition Teams and became a breast badge in the 1950s. As Underwater Demolition Teams began to be phased into the Navy SEALs, the Underwater Demolition Badge was used as a template for the new SEAL Badge.

During the Vietnam War, the Underwater Demolition Badge was issued side by side with the Special Warfare Badge (SEAL Badge). By 1975, the Underwater Demolition Badge had been declared obsolete and was no longer issued for uniform wear. Service members who had previously held the Underwater Demolition Badge could apply for the award of the SEAL Badge in lieu of the obsolete decoration.

The Underwater Demolition Badge appears as a crossed anchor, trident and pistol insignia. The decoration is identical to the Special Warfare Badge with the exception of the eagle upon which the SEAL badge is based.

In 2006 the Navy created the Special Warfare Operator rating, which consists entirely of SEALs. The rating's specialty mark is identical to the Underwater Demolition badge's original design but in silver. The Navy Warrant Officer device for Special Warfare Technician is also this same design in gold.

== See also ==
- List of United States Navy enlisted warfare designations
- Badges of the United States Navy
- Obsolete badges of the United States military
- Uniforms of the United States Navy
