= Roseboro, North Carolina =

- Town
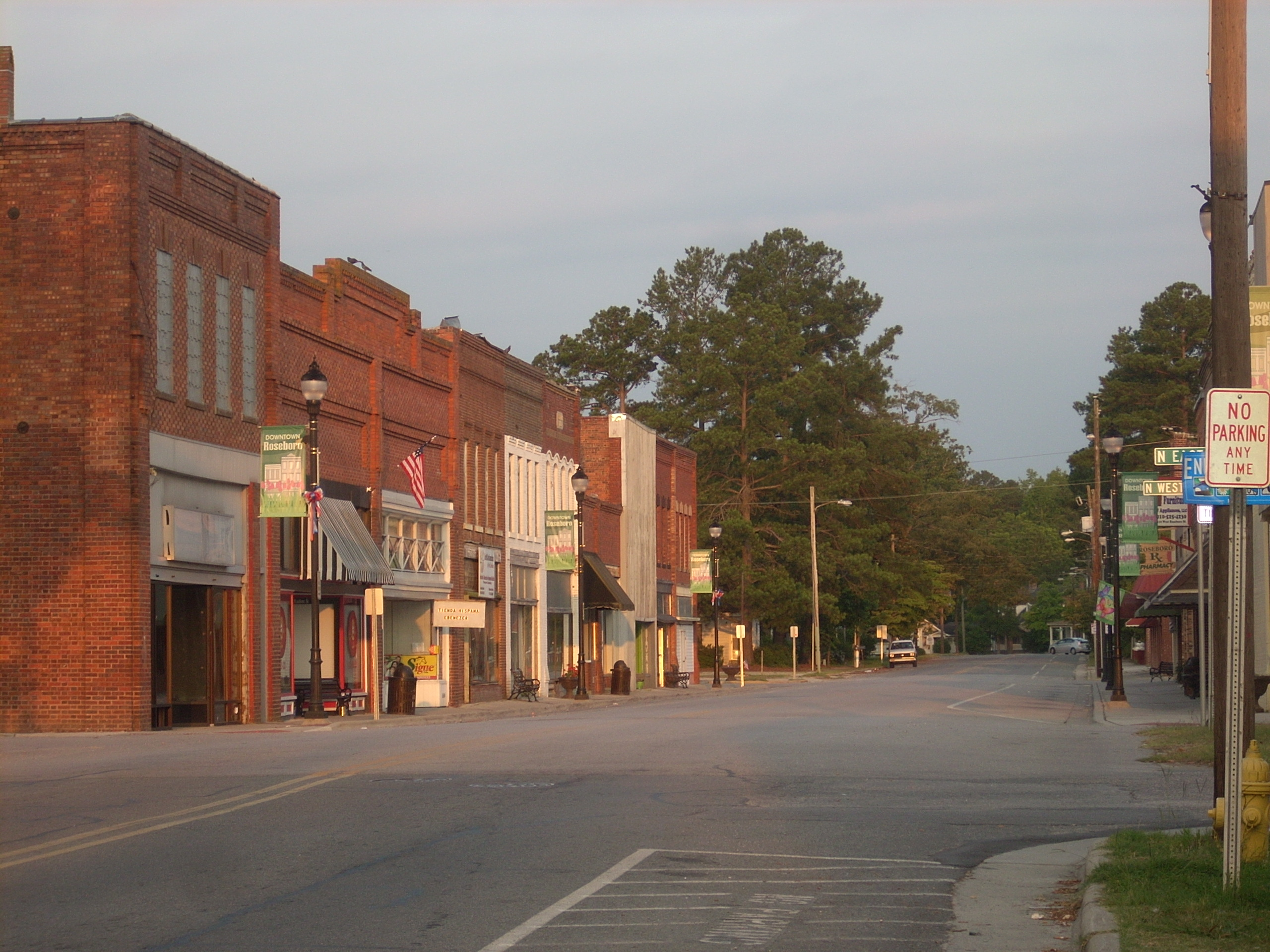
- Downtown Roseboro
- Motto: Take Root and Bloom
- Location within the state of North Carolina
- Coordinates: 34°57′18″N 78°30′49″W
- Country: United States
- State: North Carolina
- County: Sampson

Area
  - Total: 1.45 sq mi (3.75 km^{2})
  - Land: 1.45 sq mi (3.75 km^{2})
  - Water: 0.0039 sq mi (0.01 km^{2})
- Elevation: 125 ft (38 m)

Population (2020)
  - Total: 1,163
  - Density: 804.0/sq mi (310.42/km^{2})
- Time zone: UTC-5 (Eastern (EST))
  - Summer (DST): UTC-4 (EDT)
- ZIP code: 28382
- Area codes: 910, 472
- FIPS code: 37-57800
- GNIS feature ID: 2407245
- Website: https://www.roseboronc.com/

Roseboro is a town in Sampson County, North Carolina, United States. The population was 1,163 at the 2020 census.

== History ==
Roseboro was founded when the Cape Fear and Yadkin Valley Railway built a line from Fayetteville to Wilmington, and it joined Stedman, Autryville, Garland, Kerr Station and several other communities that sprang to life when depots were built and commerce came into being. The railroad was built in 1889-1890.

There are two stories of how Roseboro got its name, but research has proven it to be named after John M. Rose, secretary of the Cape Fear and Yadkin Valley Railroad. The town has grown since 1889. Roseboro was incorporated in 1891 by the North Carolina General Assembly and the first mayor was Almond Butler, an ancestor of Miss Ossie Butler, long time town clerk for Roseboro. According to a copy of the town charter on file in the town office, E.R. Johnson was the first town marshal. All but one of the first commissioner's last names is still prominent in the town. Roseboro did not do a lot of growing at first. First accounts of the town are of a few houses and several general stores.

Roseboro's oldest building was constructed around 1897 by W.J. Fisher. In 1908, Dr. Paul M. Crumpler practiced medicine in front of the building while Whit Tart operated a drug store in the rear, thus the beginning of Tart & West Drug Store.

The Dan E. Caison Sr. House, Troy Herring House, and Howell–Butler House were listed on the National Register of Historic Places in 1986.

== Geography ==
According to the United States Census Bureau, the town has a total area of 1.2 square miles (3.1 km^{2}), all land.

== Demographics ==
Historical population
Census	Pop.	Note	%±
1900	63		—
1910	183		190.5%
1920	749		309.3%
1930	768		2.5%
1940	939		22.3%
1950	1,241		32.2%
1960	1,354		9.1%
1970	1,235		−8.8%
1980	1,227		−0.6%
1990	1,441		17.4%
2000	1,267		−12.1%
2010	1,191		−6.0%
2020	1,163		−2.4%
U.S. Decennial Census

=== 2020 census ===
Roseboro racial composition
Race	Number	Percentage
White (non-Hispanic)	448	38.52%
Black or African American (non-Hispanic)	547	47.03%
Native American	3	0.26%
Asian	10	0.86%
Other/Mixed	61	5.25%
Hispanic or Latino	94	8.08%

As of the 2020 United States census, there were 1,163 people, 549 households, and 275 families residing in the town.

=== 2000 census ===
As of the census of 2000, there were 1,267 people, 509 households, and 365 families residing in the town. The population density was 1,084.8 inhabitants per square mile (418.8/km^{2}). There were 567 housing units at an average density of 485.5 per square mile (187.5/km^{2}). The racial makeup of the town was 47.43% White, 48.93% African American, 1.26% Native American, 0.32% Asian, 1.58% from other races, and 0.47% from two or more races. Hispanic or Latino of any race were 2.60% of the population.

There were 509 households, out of which 37.5% had children under the age of 18 living with them, 40.7% were married couples living together, 25.9% had a female householder with no husband present, and 28.1% were non-families. 25.0% of all households were made up of individuals, and 13.2% had someone living alone who was 65 years of age or older. The average household size was 2.49 and the average family size was 2.92.

In the town, the population was spread out, with 30.0% under the age of 18, 8.2% from 18 to 24, 28.0% from 25 to 44, 17.5% from 45 to 64, and 16.3% who were 65 years of age or older. The median age was 34 years. For every 100 females, there were 79.7 males. For every 100 females age 18 and over, there were 70.9 males.

The median income for a household in the town was $23,478, and the median income for a family was $26,154. Males had a median income of $29,306 versus $17,216 for females. The per capita income for the town was $15,704. About 23.6% of families and 24.9% of the population were below the poverty line, including 35.1% of those under age 18 and 18.7% of those age 65 or over.

== Notable people ==
- Rufus G. Herring, recipient of the Medal of Honor for his actions in World War II
- Bill Johnson, US representative from the state of Ohio
- Chasity Melvin, WNBA player
- Earl Strickland, professional pool player and 9 ball world champion
- George Williams III, former NFL player
