= Special Warfare insignia =

Special Warfare Insignia
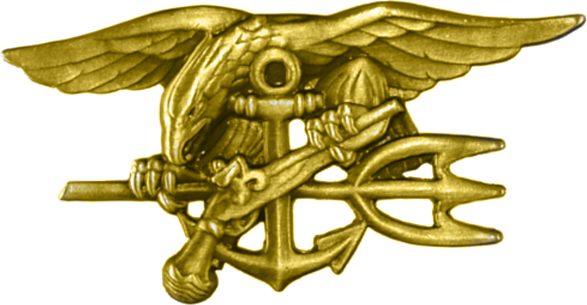
- Type: Uniform breast insignia
- Awarded for: Completing Basic Underwater Demolitions/SEAL training and SEAL Qualification Training
- Eligibility: United States Navy SEALs
- Established: 1970
- First award: Vietnam War

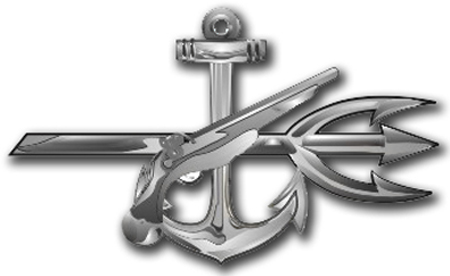
Specialty mark for Special Warfare Operator (SO) is identical to the defunct UDT insignia.

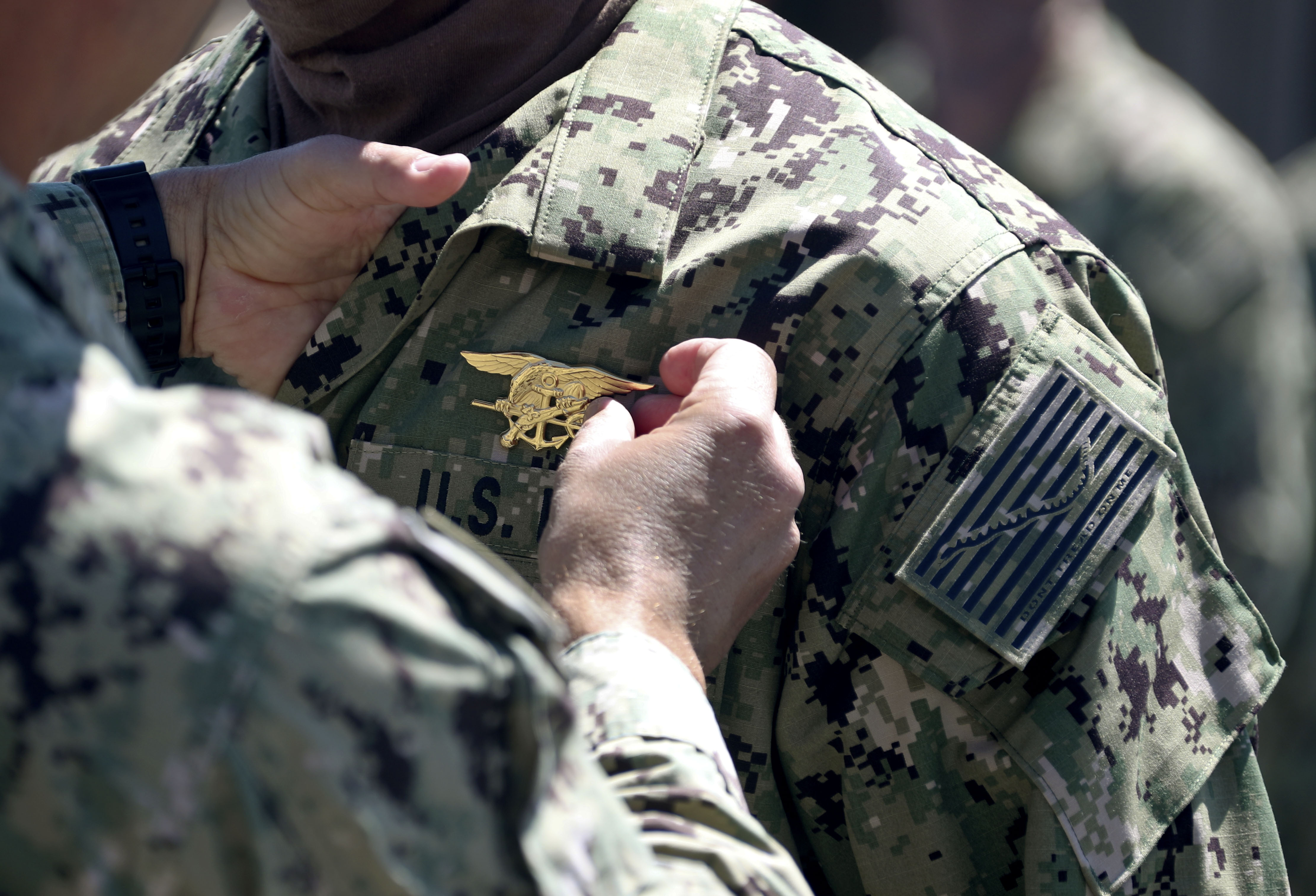
Navy SEAL receiving the pin after graduating training

The Special Warfare insignia, also known as the "SEAL Trident" or its popular nickname in the Navy community, "The Budweiser", recognizes those members of the United States Navy (USN) who have completed the Basic Underwater Demolition/SEAL (BUD/S) training, completed SEAL Qualification Training (SQT) and have been designated as U.S. Navy SEALs.

The Special Warfare insignia consists of an eagle clutching an USN anchor, trident, and flintlock-style pistol.

== History ==
In October 1969 the USN approved similar SEAL and UDT insignia for both enlisted and officer personnel (the SEAL insignia being identical, save for an eagle perched over the trident). Less than three years later, in March of 1972, the UDT insignia and SEAL insignia were officially replaced with the unified Navy Special Warfare insignia (identical to the preceding SEAL insignia). In August of 1972, the separate gold and silver insignia would be replaced with a single golden insignia for both officers and enlisted.

Per SEAL veteran and future Navy Commander Tim Bosiljevac:

By the early 1970s, since all frogmen were parachute qualified, the UDT and SEAL symbols were merged as one. The design which remained was the original SEAL design...The breast insignia could only be worn by those men who graduated from BUD/S and had additionally served a six month minimum probationary period within an active SEAL or UDT unit...The UDT/SEAL breast Insignia was too large and stood out too loudly, just like the men who wore it. Encountering such an attitude, frogmen wore it much more proudly.

The SEAL insignia is unusual in the Navy, in that it is one of the very few breast insignia issued identically for both officers and enlisted personnel. This is partly due to the combined training both officers and enlisted men receive, side by side, when involved in BUD/S training.

=== Designator and title ===
Prior to earning the Navy Special Warfare Insignia, sailors must attend and graduate from a 24-week "A" School known as Basic Underwater Demolition/SEAL (BUD/S) school, a basic parachutist course and then the 26-week SEAL Qualification Training (SQT) program. Upon completion of SQT, enlisted personnel receive the Special Warfare Operator (SO) rating, Navy Enlistment Classification (NEC) code O26A, and the SEAL warfare qualification. Commissioned naval officers receive the designation 1130 Naval Special Warfare (SEAL) Officer in lieu of the rating and NEC. Both enlisted and officers receive the same gold Navy Special Warfare Insignia. Prior to the establishment of the Special Warfare Operator (SO) rating in 2006, enlisted sailors would receive the Navy Enlisted Classification (NEC) 532X "Special Warfare Combatant Swimmer." During this era, SEAL operators were sourced from regular Naval ratings, with the title of SEAL treated like a warfare qualification, attaching (SEAL) after the rating.

Since 1972, various NECs have qualified for assignment to special warfare operations as underwater demolition/sea-air-land (UDT/SEAL) team operators and received the Navy Special Warfare Insignia. These NECs included NEC 5321 (UDT Swimmer), NEC 5322 (UDT Swimmer/EOD Technician), NEC 5323 (SDV Pilot/Navigator/DDS Operator), NEC 5326 (Combatant Swimmer, SEAL Team), NEC 5327 (Combatant Swimmer, SEAL Team/EOD Technician), and NEC 5328 (Very Shallow Water Mine Countermeasures Operator). Similarly, by 1975, UDT members who had previously held the short-lived Underwater Demolition Badge could apply for the award of the unified Navy Special Warfare Insignia in lieu of the obsolete decoration. In 2017, Naval Special Warfare Group TWO retroactively recognized Scouts and Raiders as eligible for the Special Warfare Insignia when Bruce E. McCormick, a retired Petty Officer 1st Class and an World War Two veteran, was officially pinned.

Per USN policy, personnel that have graduated BUD/S, completed SQT, and are awarded the Navy Special Warfare Insignia are considered Navy SEALs.

== See also ==
- Special warfare combatant-craft crewmen
- List of United States Navy enlisted warfare designations
- Badges of the United States Navy
- Military badges of the United States
- Obsolete badges of the United States military
- Uniforms of the United States Navy
- List of United States Navy SEALs
- Michael A. Monsoor § Funeral
