= USS LCI(L)-449 =

History

United States
- Name: USS LCI(L)-449
- Builder: New Jersey Shipbuilding, Barber, New Jersey
- Laid down: 17 June 1943
- Launched: 14 August 1943
- Commissioned: 25 August 1943, as USS LCI(L)-449
- Decommissioned: January 1946
- Reclassified: Landing Craft Infantry (Gunboat), LCI(G)-449, 16 June 1944
- Stricken: 1946
- Honors and awards: 6 battle stars, Presidential Unit Citation & Navy Unit Commendation (World War II)
- Fate: Transferred to Maritime Commission for disposal, 3 May 1948

General characteristics
- Class & type: LCI(L)-351 class large landing craft
- Displacement: 246 long tons (250 t) light; 264 long tons (268 t) landing; 419 long tons (426 t) loaded
- Length: 158 ft 5.5 in (48.3 m)
- Beam: 23 ft 3 in (7.1 m)
- Draft: Light : 3 ft 1.5 in (0.95 m) mean; Landing : 2 ft 8 in (0.81 m) forward; 4 ft 10 in (1.47 m) aft; Loaded : 5 ft 4 in (1.63 m) forward; 5 ft 11 in (1.80 m) aft
- Propulsion: 8 General Motors diesel engines, 4 per shaft, 1,600 bhp (1,193 kW); Twin variable-pitch propellers; Fuel Capacity 130 tons, lube oil 200 gal.
- Speed: 16 knots (30 km/h; 18 mph)
- Range: 4,000 nmi (7,400 km) at 12 kn (22 km/h; 14 mph) loaded; 500 nmi (930 km) at 15 kn (28 km/h; 17 mph)
- Capacity: LCI(L) : 75 tons cargo
- Troops: LCI(L) : 6 Officers, 182 Enlisted
- Complement: LCI(L) : 4 Officers, 24 Enlisted; LCI(G) : 5 Officers, 65 Enlisted
- Armament: LCI(L) : 5 × single 20 mm guns; LCI(G) : 2 × 40 mm guns; 4 × 20 mm guns; 6 × .50 cal (12.7 mm) guns; 10 × MK.7 rocket launchers
- Armor: 2-inch (51 mm) plastic splinter protection on gun turrets, conning tower and pilot house

USS LCI(L)-449 was an LCI(L)-351-class landing craft infantry built for the United States Navy during World War II. Like most ships of her class, she was not named and was known only by her designation.

The ship was laid down on 17 June 1943 by New Jersey Shipbuilding of Barber, New Jersey, launched on 14 August 1943 and commissioned as USS LCI(L)-449 on 25 August 1943.

== Service history ==
=== World War II, 1943–1946 ===
Assigned to LCI Flotilla 3 LCI(L)-449 took part in the occupation of Kwajalein and Majuro Atolls, from 31 January to 8 February 1944, receiving the Navy Unit Commendation.

On 16 June 1944 her designation changed to LCI(G)-449 (Landing Craft Infantry (Gunboat)), with the replacement of her five 20 mm guns with two 40 mm guns, four 20 mm guns, six .50 cal. machine guns and ten MK.7 rocket launchers, to provide close-in fire support.

In this new role LCI(G)-449 took part on the capture and occupation of Saipan, 20 June to 16 July 1944, of Guam, 17 to 21 July 1944, and of Tinian, 24 July to 1 August 1944.

At the invasion of Iwo Jima on 17 February 1945, the ship was heavily damaged by Japanese counter-fire and went out of control. Despite very serious wounds the ship's commanding officer, Rufus G. Herring, took the helm, rallied his men, and kept the ship in action. For his "conspicuous gallantry and intrepidity at the risk of his life above and beyond the call of duty," he was awarded the Medal of Honor, while the ship was awarded the Presidential Unit Citation.

LCI(G)-449 then took part in the Assault and occupation of Okinawa Gunto in April 1945.

=== Decommissioning and disposal ===
LCI(G)-449 was decommissioned and laid up in the Pacific Reserve Fleet, San Diego Group, in January 1946 and struck from the Naval Vessel Register that year. On 3 May 1948 she was transferred to the Maritime Commission for disposal.
