= Underwater Demolition Team =

US Navy special operations group

Underwater Demolition Teams
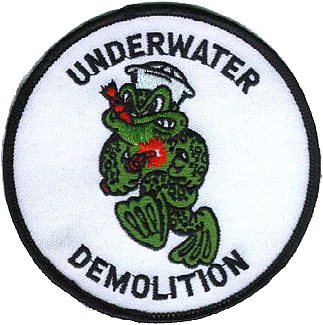
- Patch of the Underwater Demolition Teams.
- Active: 15 August 1942 – 1983 (re-designated as SEALs)
- Country: United States
- Branch: United States Navy
- Type: Amphibious warfare
- Role: Direct action; Underwater demolition; Special reconnaissance; Maritime infiltration and exfiltration
- Garrison/HQ: Fort Pierce, Florida, U.S. Maui, Hawaii, U.S.
- Nicknames: UDT, Frogmen
- Engagements: Operation Overlord; Operation Torch; Battle of Kwajalein; Battle of Roi Namur; Battle of Saipan; Battle of Tinian; Battle of Guam; Battle of Peleliu; Battle of Iwo Jima; Battle of Okinawa; Borneo campaign Battle of Leyte; Invasion of Lingayen Gulf; Operation Beleaguer; Korean War; Vietnam War

The Underwater Demolition Team (UDT), or frogmen, were amphibious units created by the United States Navy during World War II with specialized missions. They were predecessors of the Navy's current SEAL teams.

Their primary WWII function began with reconnaissance and underwater demolition of natural or man-made obstacles obstructing amphibious landings. Postwar they transitioned to scuba gear changing their capabilities. With that they came to be considered more elite and tactical during the Korean and Vietnam Wars. UDTs were pioneers in underwater demolition, closed-circuit diving, combat swimming, riverine warfare and midget submarine (dry and wet submersible) operations. They later were tasked with ensuring recovery of space capsules and astronauts after splash down in the Mercury, Gemini and Apollo space flight programs. Commando training was added making them the forerunner to the United States Navy SEAL program that exists today.

By 1983, the UDTs were re-designated as SEAL Teams or Swimmer Delivery Vehicle Teams (SDVTs); however, some UDTs, had already been re-designated into UCTs and special boat units prior. SDVTs have since been re-designated SEAL Delivery Vehicle Teams.

== Early history ==
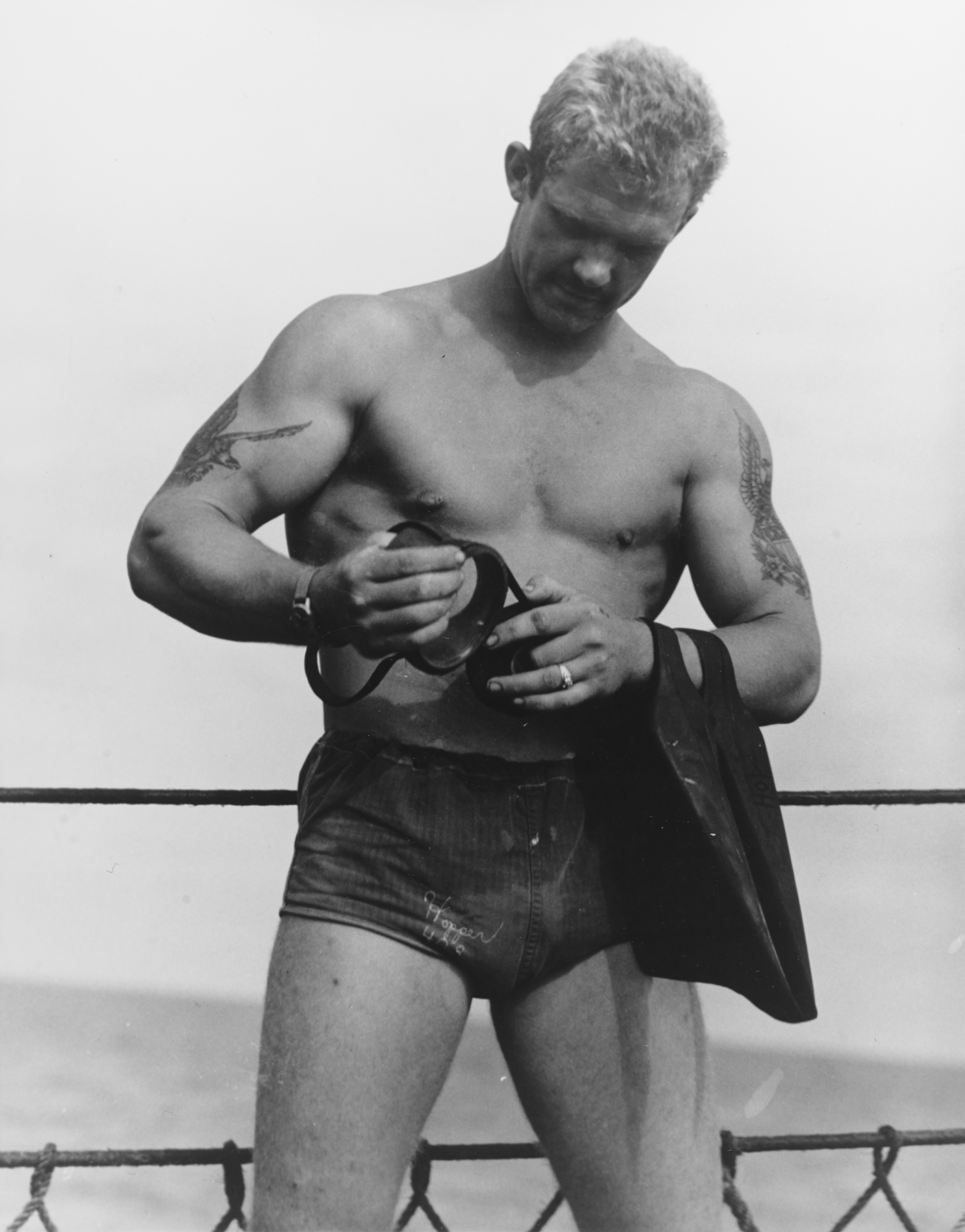
Underwater demolition swimmer checks his swim fins and face mask, during UDT operations at Balikpapan, 3 July 1945.

The United States Navy studied the problems encountered by the disastrous Allied amphibious landings during the Gallipoli Campaign of World War I. This contributed to the development and experimentation of new landing techniques in the mid-1930s. In August 1941, landing trials were performed and one hazardous operation led to Army Second Lieutenant Lloyd E. Peddicord being assigned the task of analyzing the need for a human intelligence (HUMINT) capability.

When the U.S. entered World War II, the Navy realized that in order to strike at the Axis powers the U.S. forces would need to perform a large number of amphibious attacks. The Navy decided that men would have to go in to reconnoiter the landing beaches, locate obstacles and defenses, as well as guide the landing forces ashore. In August 1942, Peddicord set up a recon school for his new unit, Navy Scouts and Raiders, at the amphibious training base at Little Creek, Virginia.

In 1942, the Army and Navy jointly established the Amphibious Scout and Raider School at Fort Pierce, Florida. Here Lieutenant Commander Phil H. Bucklew, the "Father of Naval Special Warfare", helped organize and train what became the Navy's 'first group' to specialize in amphibious raids and tactics.

The need for intelligence gathering prior to landings became paramount following the amphibious assault at the Battle of Tarawa in November 1943. Although Navy and Marine Corps planners had identified coral as an issue, they incorrectly assumed landing craft would be able to crawl over the coral. Marines were forced to exit their craft in chest deep water a thousand yards from shore, with many men drowning due to the irregularities of the reefs and Japanese gunners inflicting heavy U.S. casualties.

After that experience, Rear Admiral Kelley Turner, Commander of the V Amphibious Corps (VAC), directed Seabee Lt. Crist (CEC) to come up with a means to deal with the coral and the men to do it. Lt. Crist staged 30 officers and 150 enlisted men from the 7th Naval Construction Regiment at Waipio Amphibious Operating Base on Oahu to form the nucleus of a reconnaissance and demolition training program. It is here that the UDTs of the Pacific were born.

Later in war, the Army Engineers passed down demolition jobs to the U.S. Navy. It then became the Navy's responsibility to clear any obstacles and defenses in the near shore area.

A memorial to the founding of the UDT has been built at Bellows Air Force Station near the original Amphibious Training Base (ATB) in Oahu.

== Naval Combat Demolition Units ==
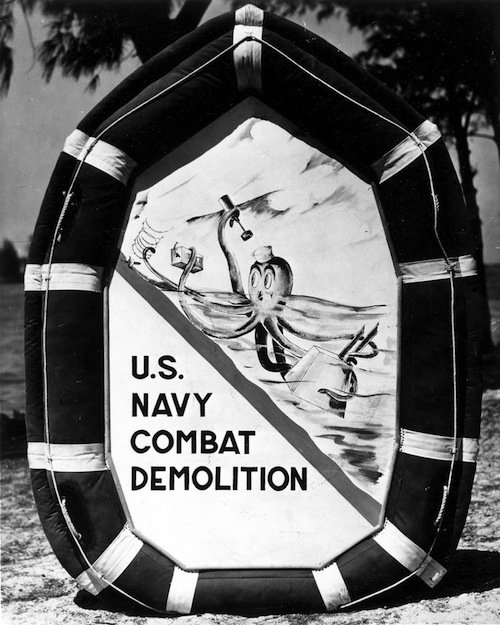
U.S. Naval Combat Demolition insignia – U.S. Navy Seal Museum

U.S. Naval combat underwater demolition team training manual (1944)

In early May 1943, a two-phase "Naval Demolition Project" was ordered by the chief of naval operations (CNO) "to meet a present and urgent requirement". The first phase began at Amphibious Training Base (ATB) Solomons, Maryland, with the establishment of Operational Naval Demolition Unit No. 1. Six officers and eighteen enlisted men reported from the Seabees dynamiting and demolition school at Camp Peary for a four-week course. Those Seabees were immediately sent to participate in the invasion of Sicily, where they were divided in three groups that landed on the beaches near Licata, Gela and Scoglitti.

Also in May, the Navy created Naval Combat Demolition Units (NCDUs) tasked with eliminating beach obstructions in advance of amphibious assaults, going ashore in an LCRS inflatable boat. Each NCDU consisted of five enlisted men led by a single, junior (CEC) officer. In early May, Chief of Naval Operations Admiral Ernest J. King picked Lieutenant Commander Draper L. Kauffman to lead the training. The first six classes graduated from "Area E" at the Seabee's Camp Peary between May and mid-July. Training was moved to Fort Pierce, Florida, where the first class began mid-July 1943. Despite the move and having the Scouts Raiders base close by, Camp Peary was Kauffman's primary source of recruits. "He would go up to Camp Peary's Dynamite School and assemble the Seabees in the auditorium saying: I need volunteers for hazardous, prolonged and distant duty." Kauffman's other volunteers came from the U.S. Marines and U.S. Army combat engineers. Training commenced with one grueling week designed to "separate the men from the boys". Some said that "the men had sense enough to quit, leaving Kauffman with the boys." It was and is still considered the first "Hell Week".

=== Normandy ===
In early November 1943, NCDU-11 was assigned as the advance NCDU party for Operation Overlord. They would be joined in England by 33 more NCDUs. They trained with the 146th, 277th, and 299th Combat Engineers to prepare for the landing. Each Unit had five combat engineers attached to it. The first 10 NCDUs divided into three groups. The senior officer, by rank, was the commanding officer of Group III, Lieutenant Smith (CEC). He assumed command in an unofficial capacity. His Group III worked on experimental demolitions and developed the Hagensen Pack, an innovation that used 2.5-pound (1.1 kg) of tetryl placed into rubber tubes that could be twisted around obstacles. As more teams arrived, a NCDU Command was created for NCDUs: 11, 22–30, 41–46, 127–8, and 130–42.

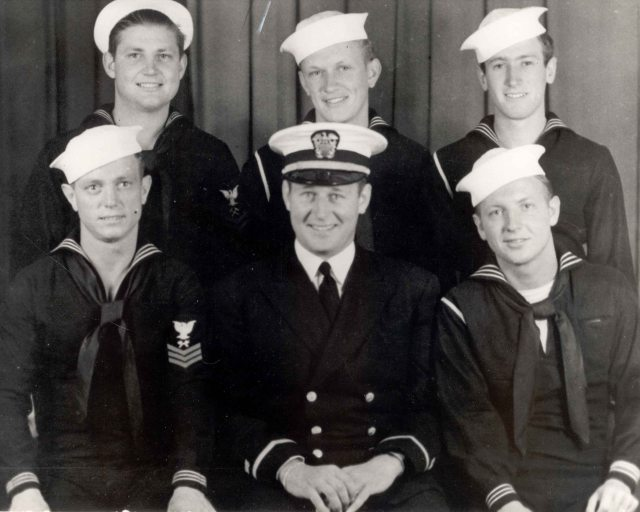
"NCDU 45"; Ensign Karnowski, Chief Carpenters Mate Conrad C. Millis, MMCB2 Lester Meyers and three gunners mates. The unit received a Presidential Unit Citation with Ens. Karnowski earning the Navy Cross & French Croix de Guerre with Palm, while MM2 Meyers received a Silver Star. Two men were wounded and one was killed.

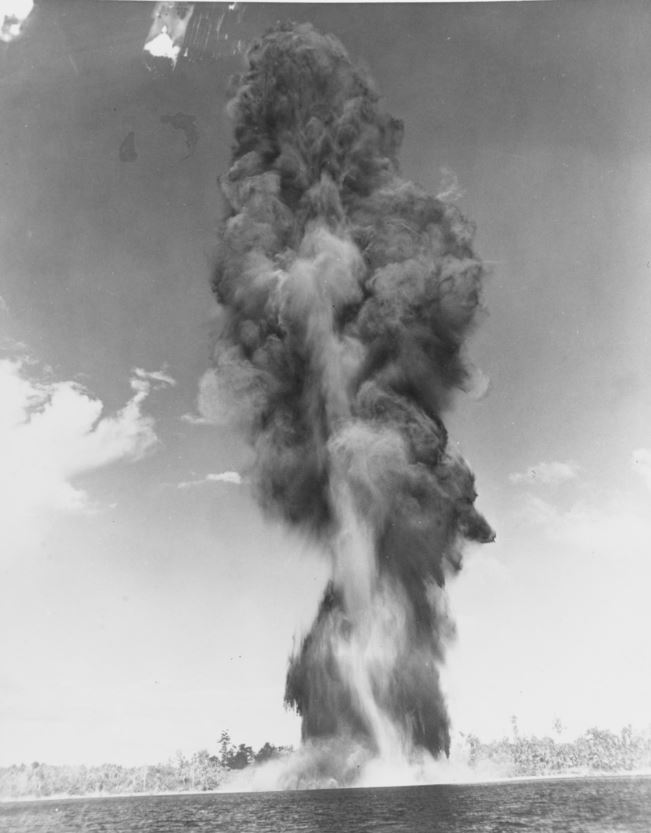
80-G-258013 At Morotai NCDU 21 with MacArthur's 7th Fleet makes a channel using 8 tons of explosives in a single blast. Debris was thrown 800 yards or nearly a half mile.

The Germans had constructed elaborate defenses on the French coast. These included steel posts driven into the beach and topped with explosive charges. Large 3-ton steel barricades, called Belgian Gates and hedgehogs, were placed throughout the tidal zone. Behind which was a network of reinforced coastal artillery, mortar and machine gun positions.

The NCDU teams (designated Demolitions Gap-Assault teams) would come in at low tide to clear the obstacles. Their mission was to open sixteen 50-foot (15 m) wide corridors for the landing at each of the U.S. landing zones (Omaha Beach and Utah Beach). Unfortunately, the plans were not executed as laid out. The preparatory air and naval bombardment was ineffective, leaving many German guns to fire on the assault. Also, tidal conditions caused difficulties for the NCDUs. Despite heavy German fire and casualties, the NCDUs charges opened gaps in the defenses.

As the infantry came ashore, some used obstacles for cover that had demolition charges on them. The greatest difficulty was on Omaha Beach. By nightfall, thirteen of the planned sixteen gaps were open. Of the 175 NCDU men that landed, 31 were killed, and 60 were wounded. The attack on Utah Beach was better, four dead and eleven wounded. Overall, NCDUs suffered a 53 percent casualty rate. NCDUs were also assigned to Operation Dragoon, the invasion of southern France, with a few units from Normandy participating there too.

With Europe invaded, Admiral Turner requisitioned all available NCDUs from Fort Pierce for integration into the UDTs for the Pacific. However, the first NCDUs, 1–10, had been staged at Turner City, Florida Island in the Solomon Islands during January 1944. A few were temporarily attached to UDTs. Later, NCDUs 1–10 were combined to form Underwater Demolition Team Able. This team was disbanded with NCDUs 2 and 3, plus three others assigned to MacArthur's 7th Amphibious force, and were the only NCDUs remaining at war's end. The other men from Team Able were assigned to numbered UDTs.

== Underwater Demolition Teams During WWII ==
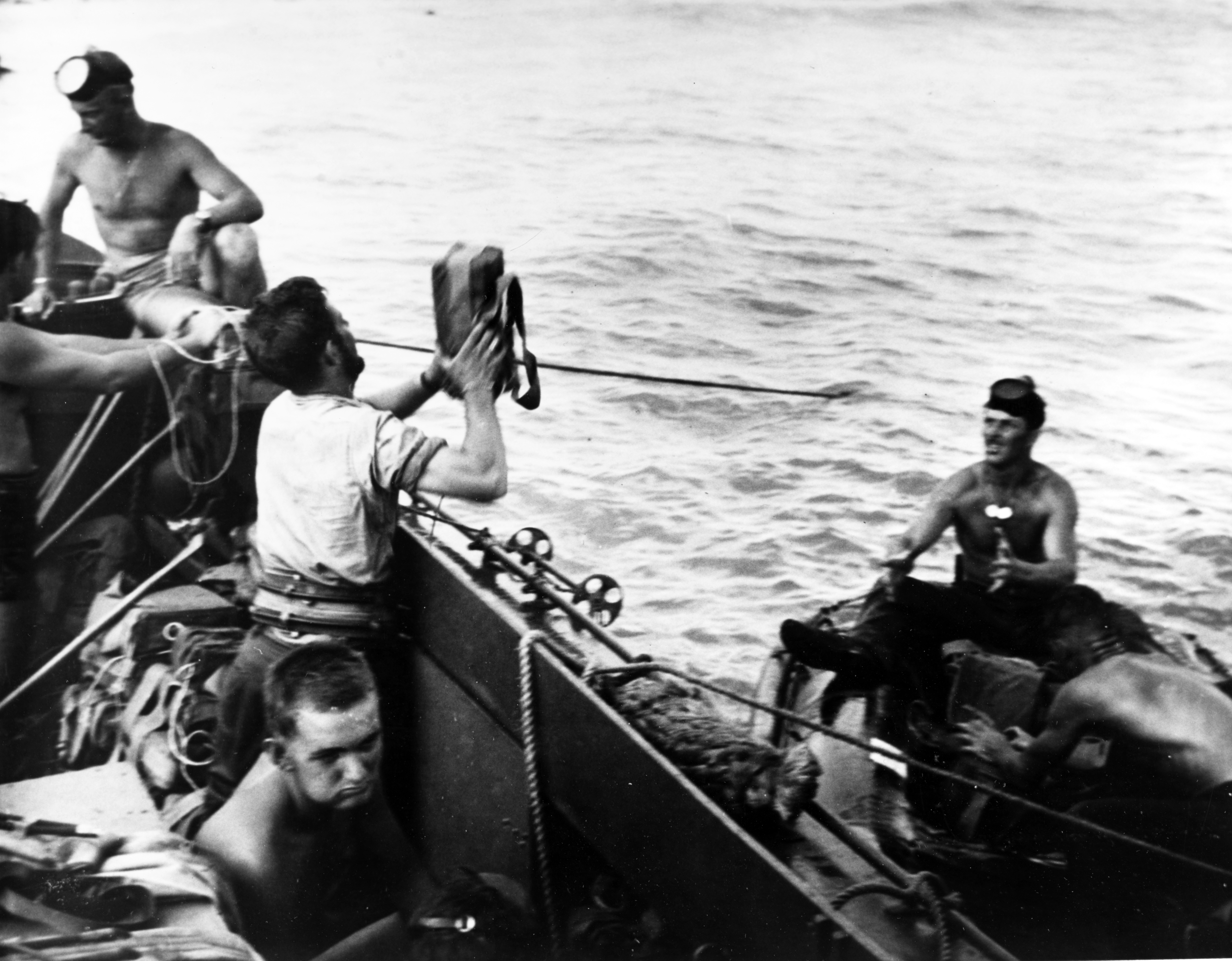
Underwater demolition team members pass an explosive charge preparing for Saipan Invasion, June 1944.

The first units designated as Underwater Demolition Teams were formed in the Pacific Theater. Rear Admiral Turner, the Navy's amphibious expert, ordered the formation of Underwater Demolition Teams in response to the assault debacle experienced at Tarawa. Turner recognized that amphibious operations required intelligence of underwater obstacles. The personnel in teams 1-15 were primarily Seabees that had started out in the NCDUs. UDT training was at the Waipio Amphibious Operating Base, under V Amphibious Corps operational and administrative control. Most of the instructors and trainees were graduates of the Fort Pierce NCDU or Scouts and Raiders schools, Seabees, Marines, and Army soldiers.

When Teams 1 and 2 were formed they were "provisional" and trained by a Marine Corps Amphibious Reconnaissance Battalion that had nothing to do with the Fort Pierce program. After a successful mission at Kwajalein, where 2 UDT men stripped down to swim trunks and effectively gathered the intelligence Admiral Turner desired, the UDT mission model evolved to daylight reconnaissance, wearing swim trunks, fins, and masks. The immediate success of the UDTs made them an indispensable part of all future amphibious landings.

A UDT was organized with approximately sixteen officers and eighty enlisted. One Marine and one Army officer were liaisons within each team. They were deployed in every major amphibious landing after Tarawa with 34 teams eventually being commissioned. Teams 1–21 were the teams that had deployed operationally, with slightly over half of the officers and enlisted coming from the Seabees in those teams. The remaining teams were not deployed due to the war ending.

=== Tarawa and the formation of UDTs ===
Prior to Tarawa, both Naval and Marine Corps planners had identified coral as an issue for amphibious operations. At Tarawa the neap tide created draft issues for the Higgins boats (LCVPs) clearing the reef. The Amtracs carrying the first wave crossed the reef successfully. The LCVPs carrying the second wave ran aground, disembarking their Marines several hundred yards to shore in full combat gear, under heavy fire. Many drowned or were killed before making the beach, forced to wade across treacherously uneven coral. The first wave was left fighting without reinforcements and took heavy casualties on the beach.

This disaster made it clear to Admiral Turner that pre-assault intelligence was needed to avoid similar difficulties in future operations. To that end, Turner ordered the formation of underwater demolition teams to do reconnaissance of beach conditions and do removal of submerged obstructions for Amphibious operations. After a thorough review, V Amphibious Corps found that the only people having any applicable experience with the coral were men in the Naval Construction Battalions. The Admiral tasked Lt. Thomas C. Crist (CEC) of CB 10 to develop a method for blasting coral under combat conditions and putting together a team for that purpose. Lt. Crist started by recruiting others he had blasted coral with in CB 10 and by the end November 1943 he had assembled close to 30 officers and 150 enlisted men from the 7th Naval Construction Regiment, at Waipio Amphibious Operating Base on Maui.

=== Kwajalein and the evolution of the UDT mission model ===
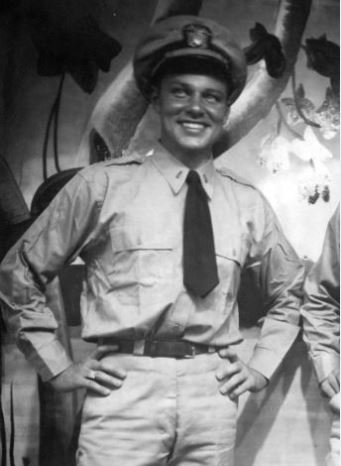
Lt Luehrs was one of the 30 Officers from the 7th NCR that Lt. Crist staged for UDTs 1 & 2. He and Chief Acheson were the first UDT swimmers His Corps insignia would have had a Seabee on it.

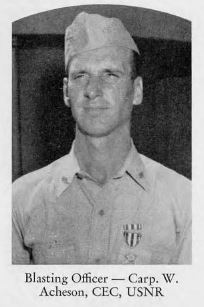
ChCarp. W. H. Achenson CEC at Silver Star award ceremony for UDT 1 action

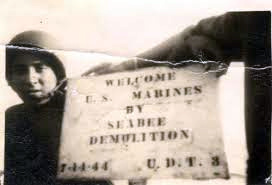
Seabees in both UDT 3 and UDT 4 made these welcome signs for the U.S. Marine Corps on Guam.

The first operation after Tarawa was Operation Flintlock in the Marshall Islands. It began with the island of Kwajalein in January 1944. Admiral Turner wanted the intelligence and to get it, the men that Lt. Crist had staged were used to form Underwater Demolition Teams: UDT 1 and UDT 2. Initially, the team commanders were Cmdr. E. D. Brewster (CEC) and Lt. Crist (CEC). However, Lt. Crist was made Ops officer of Team 2 and Lt. John T. Koehler was made the team Commander. As with all Seabee military training, the Marines provided it. A Marine Corps Amphibious Reconnaissance Battalion oversaw five weeks further training of the Seabees in UDTs 1 and 2 to prepare for the mission. UDT 1 was tasked with two daylight recons. The men were to follow Marine Corps Recon procedure with each two-man team getting close to the beach in an inflatable boat to make their observations wearing fatigues, boots, d helmets, and life-lined to their boats. Team 1 found that the reef kept them from ascertaining conditions both in the water and on the beach as had been anticipated. In keeping with the Seabee traditions of: (1) doing whatever it takes to accomplish the job and (2) not always following military rules to get it done, UDT 1 did both: the fatigues and boots came off.

Ensign Lewis F. Luehrs and Seabee Chief Bill Acheson had anticipated that they would not be able to get the intel Admiral Turner wanted following USMC Recon protocol and had worn swim trunks beneath their fatigues. Stripping down, they swam 45 minutes undetected across the reef returning with sketches of gun emplacements and other intelligence. Still in their trunks, they were taken directly to Rear Admiral Turner's flagship to report. Afterwards, Turner concluded that the only way to get this kind of information was to do what these men had done as individual swimmers, which is what he relayed to Admiral Nimitz. The planning and decisions of Rear Admiral Turner, Ensign Luehrs, and Chief Acheson made Kwajalein a developmental day in UDT history, changing both the mission model and training regimen. Luehrs would make rank and be in UDT 3 until he was made XO of UDT 18. Acheson and three other UDT officers were posted to the 301st CB as blasting officers. The 301st specialized in Harbor dredging. It saved UDT teams from blasting channels and harbor clearance, but it required its own blasters.

Admiral Turner ordered the formation of nine teams, six for V AC and three for III Amphibious Corps. Seabees made up the majority of the men in teams 1–9, 13 and 15. The officers of those teams were primarily CEC (Seabees). UDT 2 was sent to Roi-Namur where Lt. Crist earned a Silver Star. UDTs 1 and 2 were decommissioned upon return to Hawaii with most of the men transferred to UDTs 3, 4, 5, and 6. Admiral Turner ordered the formation of nine teams, three for III Amphibious Corps and six for V Amphibious Corps (in all Teams 3–11). As more NCDUs arrived in the Pacific they were used to form even more teams. UDT 15 was an all-NCDU team. To implement these changes and grow the UDTs, Koehler was made the commanding officer of the Naval Combat Demolition Training and Experimental Base on Maui. Admiral Turner also brought on LCDR Draper Kaufmann as a combat officer.

It became obvious more men were needed than the NCDUs would supply and Cmdr. Kauffman was no longer recruiting Seabees, so Admiral Nimitz put out a call to the Pacific Fleet for volunteers. They would form three teams; UDT 14 would be the first of them. Recruiting was such an issue that three Lt. Cmdrs who had no background in demolition were transferred from USN Beach Battalions to command UDTs 11, 12, and 13.

Admiral Turner requested the establishment of the Naval Combat Demolition Training and Experimental Base at Kihei independent of Fort Pierce, expanding upon what had been learned from UDT 1 at Kwajalein. Operations began in February 1944 with Lt. Crist the first head of training. Most of the procedures from Fort Pierce were changed, replaced with an emphasis on developing swimmers, daylight reconnaissance, and no lifelines. The uniform of the day changed to diving masks, swim trunks, and a Ka-Bar, creating the UDT image as "Naked Warriors" (swim-fins were added after UDT 10 introduced them).

=== Roi-Namur, Saipan, Tinian, and Guam ===
At Saipan and Tinian UDTs 5, 6, and 7 were given the missions: day time for Saipan and night for Tinian. At Saipan UDT 7 developed a method to recover swimmers on the move without making the recovery vessel a stationary target.

For Guam UDTs 3, 4, and 6 were the teams assigned. When it was over the Seabee-dominated teams had made naval history. For the Marianas operations Admiral Turner recommended over sixty Silver Stars and over three hundred Bronze Stars with Vs for UDTs 3–7 That was unprecedented in U.S. Naval/Marine Corps history.

For UDTs 5 and 7, all officers received silver stars and all the enlisted received bronze stars with Vs for Operation Forager (Tinian). For UDTs 3 and 4 all officers received a silver stars and all the enlisted received bronze stars with Vs for Operation Forager (Guam). Admiral Conolly felt the commanders of teams 3 and 4 (Lt. Crist and Lt. W.G. Carberry) should have received Navy Crosses. Teams 4 & 7 also received Naval Unit Commendations.

=== Peleliu, Philippines, and Iwo Jima ===
UDTs 6, 7, and 10 drew the Peleliu assignment while UDT 8 went to Angaur. The officers were almost all CEC and the enlisted were Seabees.

At formation UDT 10 was assigned 5 officers and 24 enlisted that had trained as OSS Operational Swimmers (Maritime Unit: Operational Swimmer Group II). They were led by a Lt. A.O. Chote Jr., who became UDT 10's commanding officer. The men were multi-service: Army, Coast Guard, Marine Corps and Navy but the OSS was not allowed to operate in the Pacific Theater. Admiral Nimitz needed swimmers and did approve their transfer from the OSS to his operational and administrative control. Most of their OSS gear was stored as it was not applicable to UDT work however, their swimfins came with them. The other UDTs quickly adopted them.

UDT 14 was the first all-Navy team (one of three from the Pacific fleet) even though its CO and XO were CEC and some of Team Able was incorporated. In the Philippines Leyte Gulf UDTs 10 & 15 reconnoitered beaches at Luzon, teams 3, 4, 5, & 8 were sent to Dulag and teams 6, 9, & 10 went to Tacloban.

When UDT 3 returned to Maui the team was made the instructors of the school. Lt Crist was again made Training Officer. Under his direction training was broken into four 2-week blocks with an emphasis on swimming and reconnaissance. There were classes in night operations, unit control, coral and lava blasting in addition to bivouacking, small unit tactics and small arms. Lt Crist would be promoted to Lt Cmdr and the team would remain in Hawaii until April 1945. At that time the Seabees of UDT 3 were transferred to Fort Pierce to be the instructors there. In all they would train teams 12 to 22. Lt. Cmdr. Crist would be sent back to Hawaii.

D-minus 2 at Iwo Jima UDTs 12, 13, 14, and 15 reconnoitered the beaches from twelve LCI(G) with just one man wounded. They did come under intense heavy fire that sank three of their LCI(G) with the others seriously damaged or disabled. The LCI(G) crews suffered more than the UDTs with the skipper of one boat earning a Medal of Honor. The next day a Japanese bomb hit UDT 15's APD, USS Blessman killing fifteen and wounding 23. It was the largest loss suffered by the UDTs during the war.

On D-plus 2 the beachmaster requested help. There were so many broached or damaged landing craft and the beach was so clogged with war debris that there was no place for landing craft to get ashore. Lt Cmdr. E. Hochuli of UDT 12 volunteered his team to go deal with the problem and teams 13 and 14 were ordered to go with. Lt Cmdr. Vincent Moranz of UDT 13 was "reluctant, and radioed that his men ... were not salvage-men. It is reported that Capt. (Bull) Hanlon, Underwater Demolition Operations Commanding Officer radioed back that he did not want anything salvaged, he wanted that beach cleared." The difference in attitude between Hochuli and Moranz would be remembered in the unit awards.

The three teams worked for five days clearing the waters edge. While the teams all did the same job under the same conditions the Navy gave them different unit awards: UDT 12 a PUC, UDT 14 a NUC and UDT 13 nothing. The USMC ground commanders felt that every man that set foot on the island during the assault had an award coming. The Navy did not share this point of view, besides UDT 13 not a single USN beach party received a unit award either. On D-plus 2, when the UDTs set foot on beaches that were under a USMC assault, any unit award they received should have come under the USMC award protocol. The USMC Iwo Jima PUC/NUC was a mass award with the PUC going to assault units and the NUC going to support units.

UDTs also served at Eniwetok, Ulithi, Leyte, Lingayen Gulf, Zambales, Labuan, and Brunei Bay. At Lingayen UDT 9 was aboard the USS Belknap when she was hit by a Kamikaze. It cost the team one officer, 7 enlisted, 3 MIA and 13 wounded.

=== Okinawa to the end of the war ===
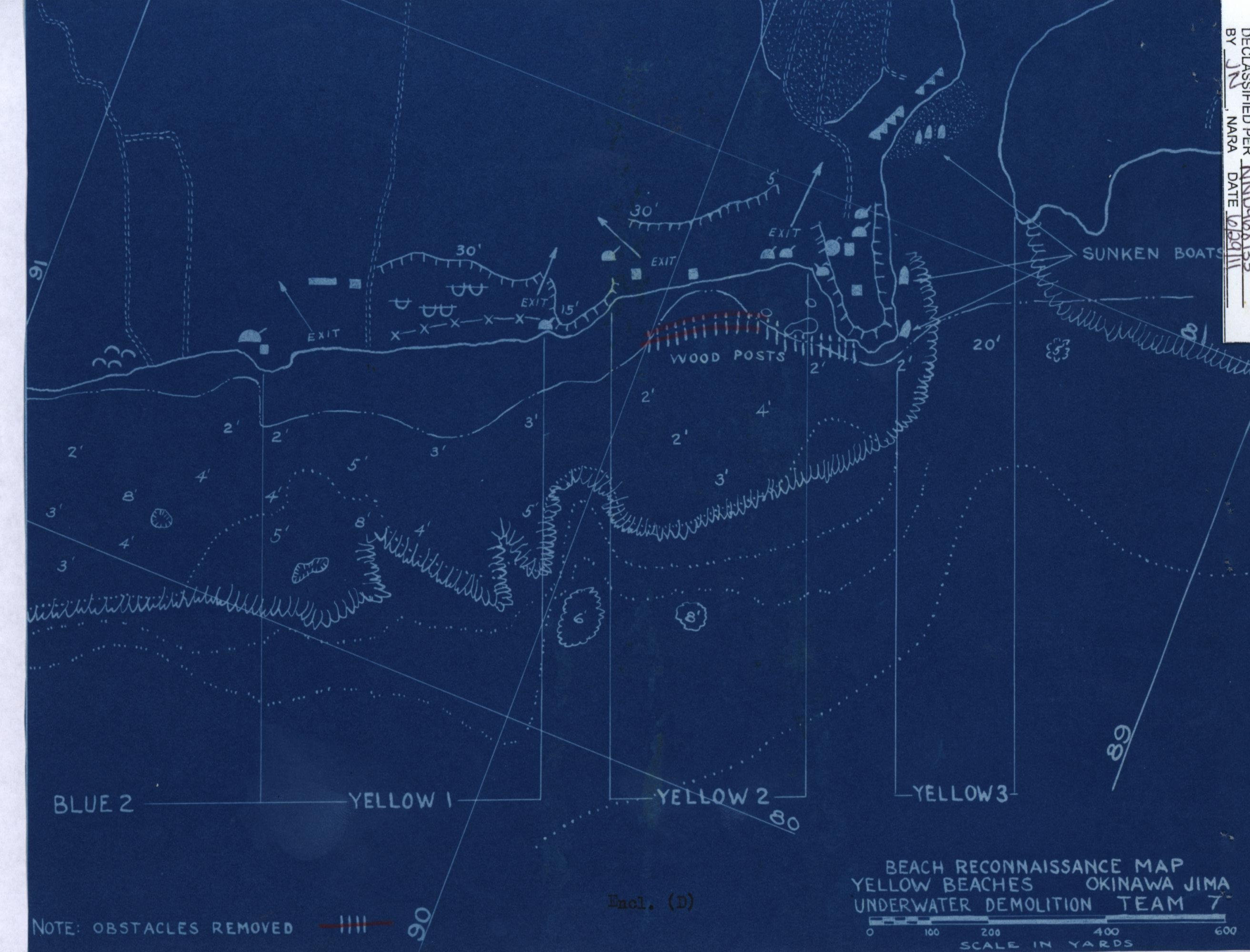
Beach reconnaissance map of Okinawa by Team 7

The largest UDT operation of WWII was the invasion of Okinawa, involving teams 7, 11, 12, 13, 14, 16, 17, and 18 (nearly 1,000 men). All prior missions had been in warm tropic waters but, the waters around Okinawa were cool enough that long immersion could cause hypothermia and severe cramps. Since thermal protection for swimmers was not available, UDTs were at risk to these hazards working around Okinawa.

Operations included both real reconnaissance and demolition at the landing beaches, and feints to create the illusion of landings in other locations. Pointed poles set into the coral reef protected the beaches on Okinawa. Teams 11 and 16 were sent in to blast the poles. The charges took out all of UDT 11's targets and half of UDT 16's. UDT 16 aborted the operation due to the death of one of their men; hence, their mission was considered a failure. UDT 11 went back the next day and took out the remaining poles after-which the team remained to guide landing-craft to the beach.

By war's end 34 teams had been formed with teams 1–21 having actually been deployed. The Seabees provided half of the men in the teams that saw service. The U.S. Navy did not publicize the existence of the UDTs until post war and when they did they gave credit to Lt. Commander Kauffman and the Seabees.

During WWII the Navy did not have a rating for the UDTs nor did they have an insignia. Those men with the CB rating on their uniforms considered themselves Seabees that were doing underwater demolition. They did not call themselves "UDTs" or "Frogmen" but rather "Demolitioneers" which had carried over from the NCDUs and LtCdr Kauffmans recruiting them from the Seabee dynamiting and demolition school. UDTs had to meet the military's standard age guidelines, Seabees older could not volunteer.

In preparation for the invasion of Japan the UDTs created a cold water training center and mid-1945 UDTs had to meet a "new physical standard". UDT 9 lost 70% of the team to this change. The last UDT demolition operation of the war was on 4 July 1945 at Balikpapan, Borneo. The UDTs continued to prepare for the invasion of Japan until VJ Day when the need for their services ceased.

With the draw-down from the war two half-strength UDTs were retained, one on each coast: UDT Baker and UDT Easy. However, the UDTs were the only special troops that avoided complete disbandment after the war, unlike the OSS Maritime Unit, the VAC Recon Battalion, and several Marine recon missions.

In 1942 the Seabees became a completely new branch of the United States War Department. The Marine Corps provided both training and an organizational model. Something that either was not shared or the Seabees chose to ignore or considered not important was the keeping of logs, journals and records. The Seabees brought this record keeping approach with to the NCDUs and UDTs.

== After World War II ==
=== Japan occupation ===
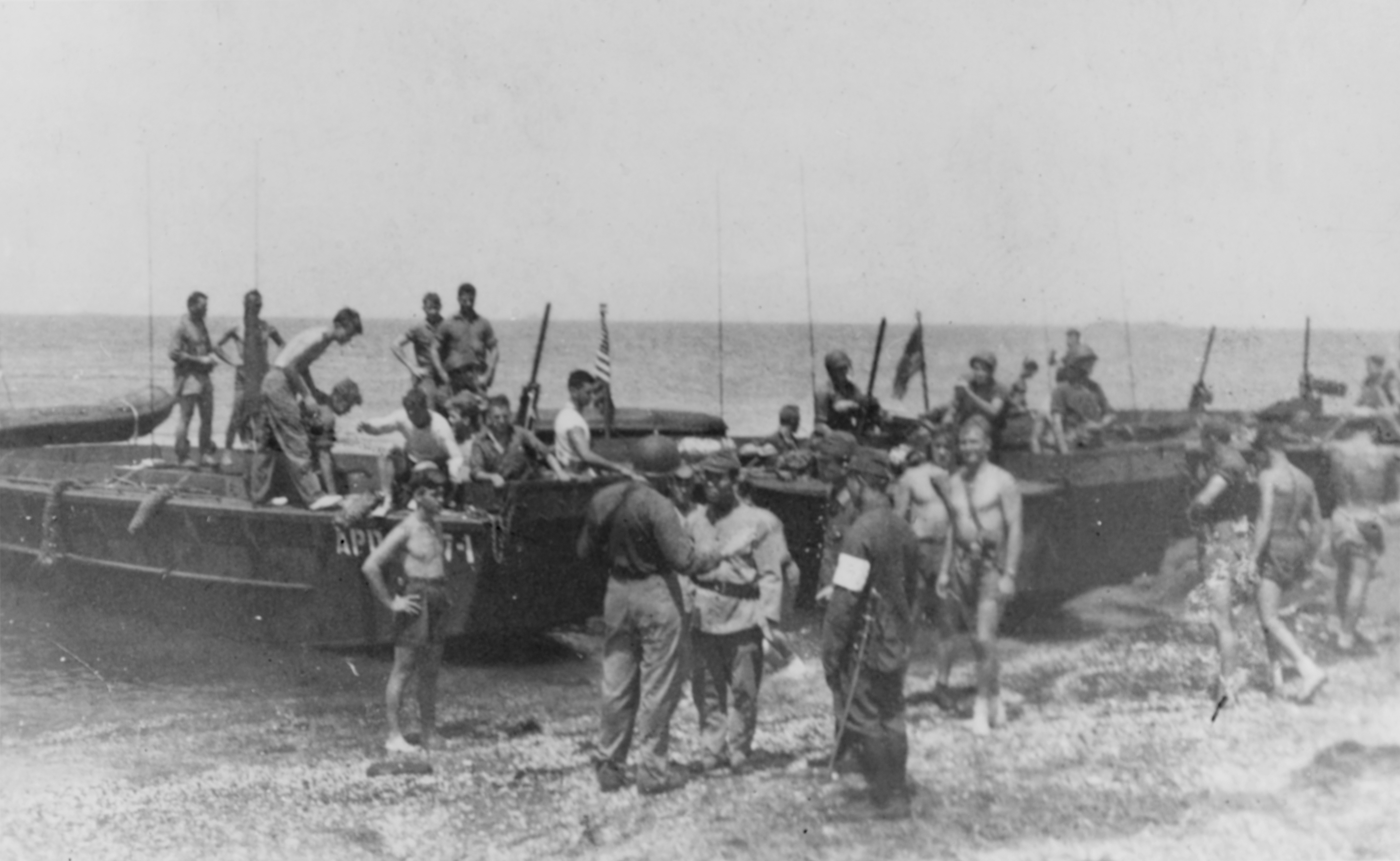
LtCmdr. Edward P. Clayton, (back to camera) Commanding Officer UDT 21, receiving the first sword surrendered to an American force in the Japanese Home islands, from a Japanese Army Coastal Artillery Major (opposite Clayton), at Futtsu-misaki Point, across Tokyo Bay from Yokosuka Naval Base, 28 August 1945. When word of this circulated LtCmdr. Clayton was ordered to give up the sword. Protocol dictated that General MacArthur should receive the first surrendered sword.

On 20 August 1945 USS Begor embarked UDT 21 at Guam as a component of the U.S. occupation force heading for Japan. Nine days later UDT 21 became the first U.S military unit to set foot on Japanese home soil when it reconned the beaches at Futtsu-misaki Point in Tokyo Bay. Their assessment was that the area was well suited for landing U.S. amphibious forces. UDT 21 made a large sign to greet the Marines on the beach. Team 21 was all fleet and the sign said greetings from "USN" UDT 21. The next day Begor took UDT 21 to Yokosuka Naval Base. There the team cleared the docks for the first U.S. warship to dock in Japan, USS San Diego. The team remained in Tokyo Bay until 8 Sept when it was tasked with locating remaining Kamikaze and two-man submarines at Katsura Wan, Uchiura Wan at Suruga Bay, Sendai, Onohama Shipyards and Choshi. Orders arrived for Begor to return the team to San Diego on 27 September.

From 21 to 26 September UDT 11 was at Nagasaki and reported men getting sick from the stench.

=== China ===
With the war over thousands of Japanese troops remained in China. The issue was given to the Marine's III Marine Amphibious Corps. UDT 9 was assigned to Operation Beleaguer to recon the landings of the 1st Marine Division at Taku and Qingdao the first two weeks of October 1945. On their way to China the Navy had UDT 8 carry out a mission at Jinaen, Korea 8–27 September 1945. When UDT 9 arrived back in the States it was made one of the two post-War teams and redesignated UDT Baker.

UDT 8 was also sent to China and was at Taku, Yantai, and Qingdao.

=== Operation Crossroads ===
Bikini Atoll was chosen for the site of the nuclear tests of Operation Crossroads.

"In March 1946, Project Y scientists from Los Alamos decided that the analysis of a sample of water from the immediate vicinity of the nuclear detonation was essential if the tests were to be properly evaluated. After consideration of several proposals to accomplish this, it was finally decided to employ drone boats of the type used by Naval Combat Demolition Units in France during the war".

UDT Easy, later named UDT 3, was given the designation TU 1.1.3 for the Operation and was assigned the control and maintenance of the drone boats. On 27 April, 7 officers and 51 enlisted men embarked the USS Begor at the Seabee base Port Hueneme, CA, for transit to Bikini. At Bikini the drones were controlled from the Begor. Once a water sample was taken the drone would return to the Begor to be hosed down for decontamination. After a Radiation Safety Officer had taken a Geiger counter reading and the OK given, the UDTs would board with a radiation chemist to retrieve the sample. Begor came to have the reputation as the most contaminated boat in the fleet.

A major issue afterwards was the treatment of the dislocated natives. In November 1948, the Bikinians were relocated to the uninhabited Island of Kili, however that island was located inside a coral reef that had no channel for access to the sea. In the spring of 1949, the governor of the Trust Territories, Marshall Group requested the U.S. Navy blast a channel to change this. That task was given to the Seabees on Kwajalin whose CO quickly determined this was actually a UDT project. He sent a request to CINCPACFLT who forwarded it to COMPHIBPAC. This ultimately resulted in the sending of UDT 3 on a Civic action program that turned out better than politicians could have hoped. The King of the Bikinians held a send off feast for the UDTs the night before they departed.

=== Submersible Operations ===
Post WWII the UDTs continued to research new techniques for underwater and shallow-water operations. One area was the use of SCUBA equipment. Dr. Chris Lambertsen had developed the Lambertsen Amphibious Respiratory Unit (LARU), an oxygen rebreather, which was used by the Maritime Unit of the OSS. In October 1943, he demonstrated it to LtCmdr. Kauffman, but was told the device was not applicable to current UDT operations. Dr. Lambertsen and the OSS continued to work on closed-circuit oxygen diving and combat swimming. When the OSS was dissolved in 1945, Lambertsen retained the LARU inventory. He later demonstrated the LARU to Army Engineers, the Coast Guard, and the UDTs. In 1947, he demonstrated the LARU to LtCmdr. Francis "Doug" Fane, then a senior UDT commander. LtCmdr. Fane was enthusiastic for new diving techniques. He pushed for the adoption of rebreathers and SCUBA gear for future operations, but the Navy Experimental Diving Unit and the Navy Dive School, which used the old "hard-hat" diving apparatus, declared the new equipment be too dangerous. Nonetheless, LtCmdr. Fane invited Dr. Lambertsen to NAB Little Creek, Virginia in January 1948 to demonstrate and train UDT personnel in SCUBA operations. This was the first-ever SCUBA training for USN divers. Following this training, Lcdr. Fane and Dr. Lambertsen demonstrated new UDT capabilities with a successful lock-out and re-entry from USS Grouper, an underway submarine, to show the Navy's need for this capability. LtCmdr. Fane then started the classified "Submersible Operations" or SUBOPS platoon with men drawn from UDT 2 and 4 under the direction of Lieutenant (junior grade) Bruce Dunning.

LtCmdr. Fane also brought the conventional "Aqua-lung" open-circuit SCUBA system into use by the UDTs. Open-circuit SCUBA is less useful to combat divers, as the exhausted air produces a tell-tale trail of bubbles. However, in the early 1950s, the UDTs decided they preferred open-circuit SCUBA, and converted entirely to it. The remaining stock of LARUs was supposedly destroyed in a beach-party bonfire. Later on, the UDT reverted to closed-circuit SCUBA, using improved rebreathers developed by Dr. Lambertsen.

It was at this time that the UDTs, led by LtCmdr. Fane, established training facilities at Saint Thomas in the Virgin Islands.

The UDTs also began developing weapons skills and procedures for commando operations on land in coastal regions. The UDTs started experiments with insertion/extraction by helicopter, jumping from a moving helicopter into the water or rappelling like mountain climbers to the ground. Experimentation developed a system for emergency extraction by plane called "Skyhook". Skyhook utilized a large helium balloon and cable rig with harness. A special grabbing device on the nose of a C-130 enabled a pilot to snatch the cable tethered to the balloon and lift a person off the ground. Once airborne, the crew would winch the cable in and retrieve the personnel though the back of the aircraft. Training this technique was discontinued following the death of a SEAL at NAB Coronado during a training exercise. Teams still utilize the Skyhook for equipment extraction and retain the combat capability for personnel if needed.

== Korean War ==
During the Korean War, the UDTs operated on the coasts of North Korea, with their efforts initially focused on demolitions and mine disposal. Additionally, the UDT accompanied South Korean commandos on raids in the North to demolish railroad tunnels and bridges. The higher-ranking officers of the UDT frowned upon this activity because it was a non-traditional use of the Naval forces, which took them too far from the water line. Due to the nature of the war, the UDT maintained a low operational profile. Some of the better-known missions include the transport of spies into North Korea, and the destruction of North Korean fishing nets.

A more traditional role for the UDT was in support of Operation CHROMITE, the amphibious landing at Inchon. UDT 1 and UDT 3 divers went in ahead of the landing craft, scouting mud flats, marking low points in the channel, clearing fouled propellers, and searching for mines. Four UDT personnel acted as wave-guides for the Marine landing.

The UDT assisted in clearing mines in Wonsan harbor, under fire from enemy shore batteries. Two minesweepers were sunk in these operations. A UDT diver dove on the wreck of USS Pledge (AM-277), the first U.S. combat operation using SCUBA gear.

The Korean War was a period of transition for the men of the UDT. They tested their previous limits and defined new parameters for their special style of warfare. These new techniques and expanded horizons positioned the UDT well to assume an even broader role as war began brewing to the south in Vietnam.

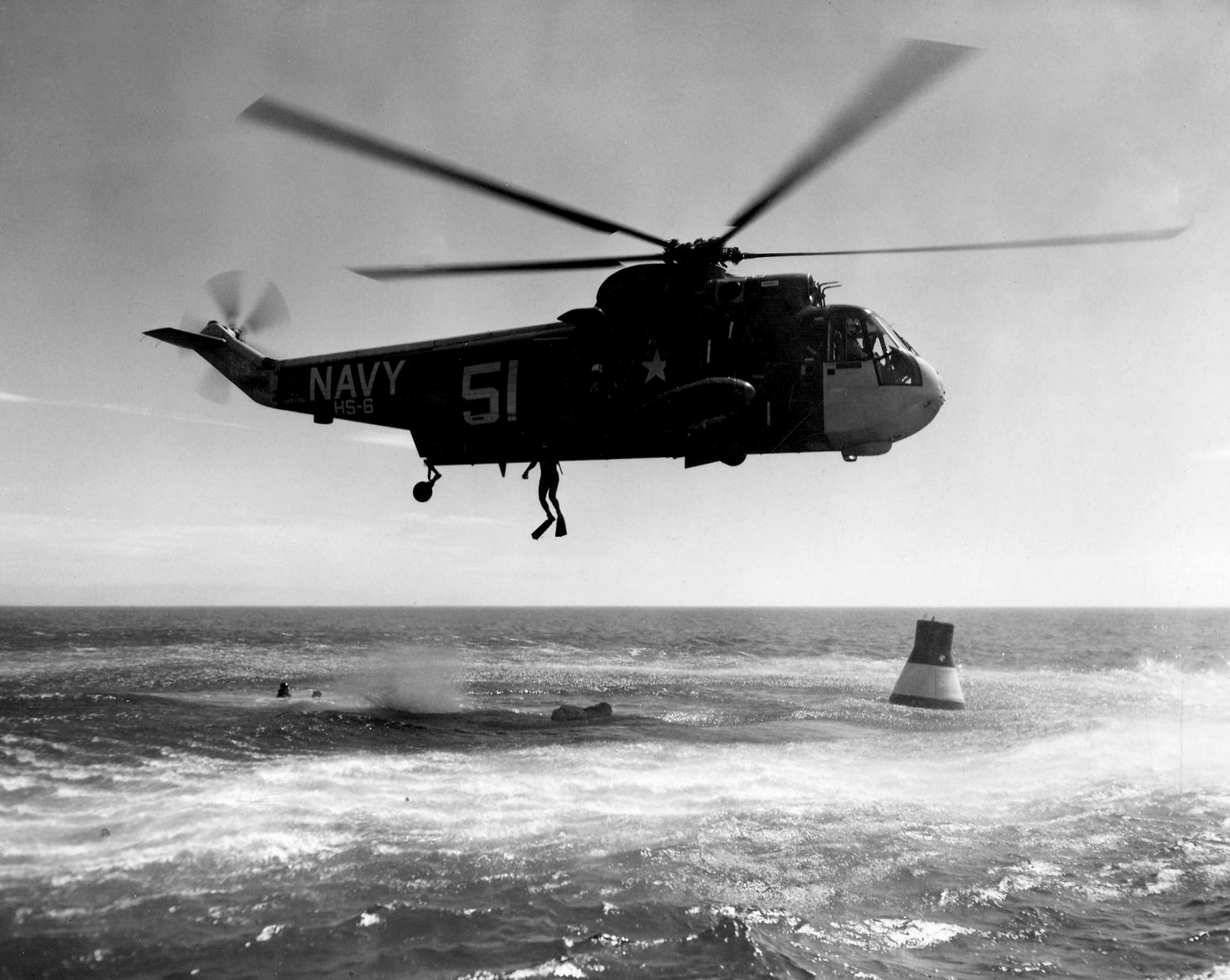
Mercury space capsule recovery practice UDTs exiting SH-3A Sea King HS-6

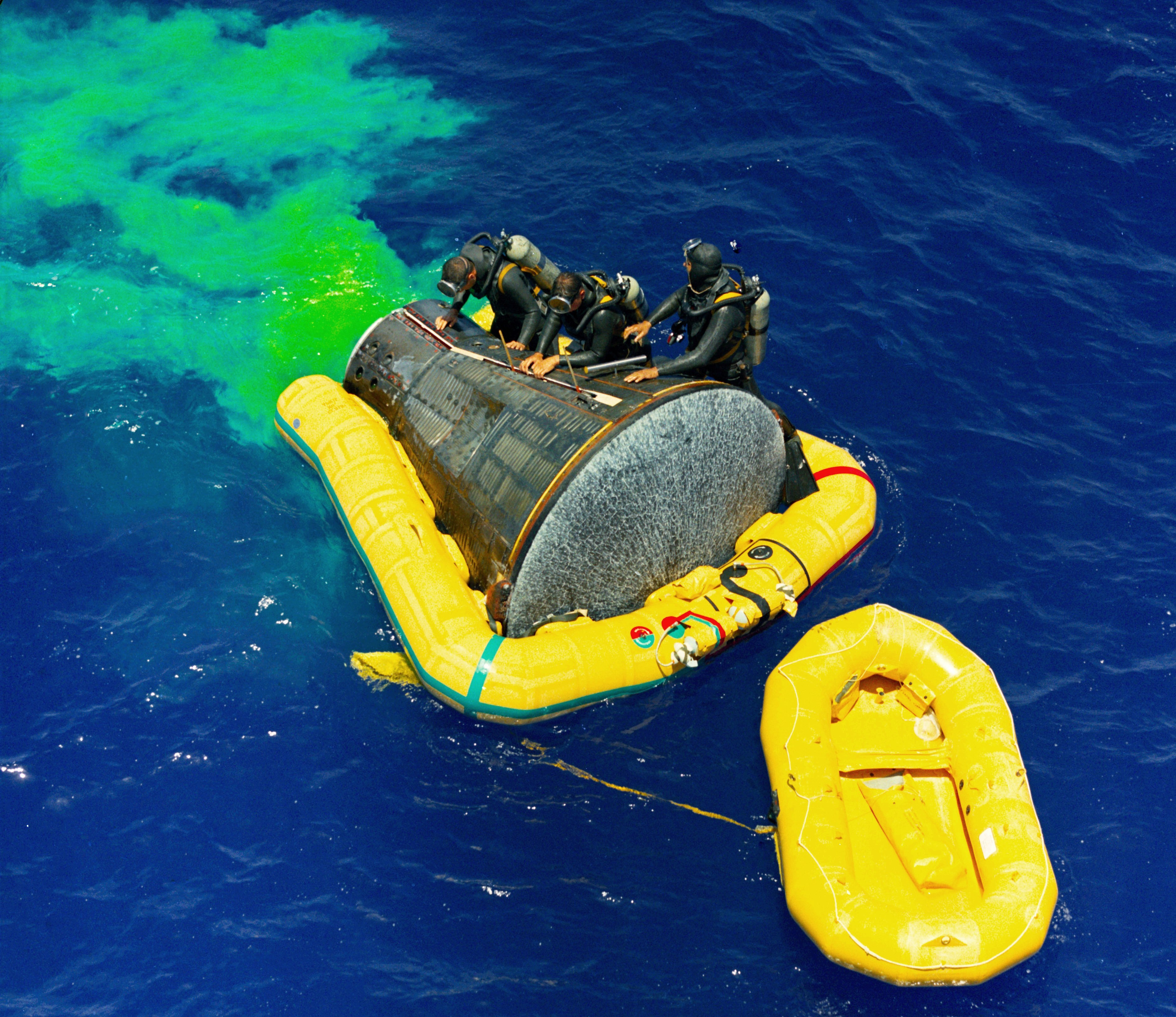
Gemini 4 recover operations – S65-33491

== NASA ==
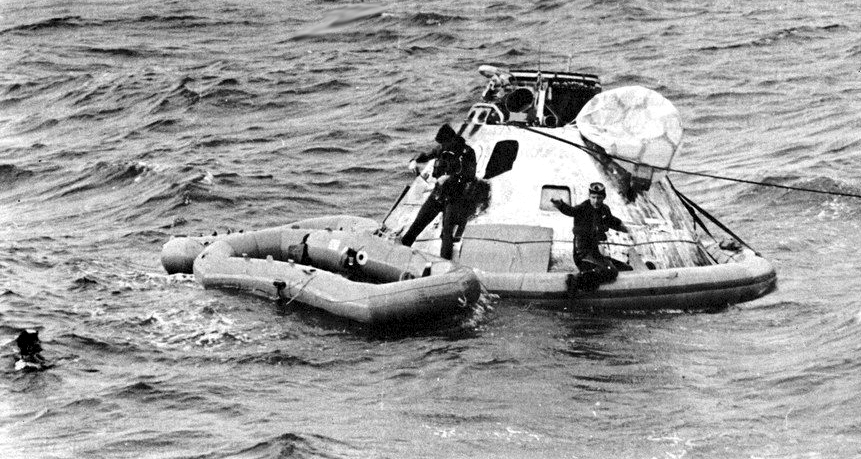
Apollo 8 capsule being recovered by UDT-12, 1968

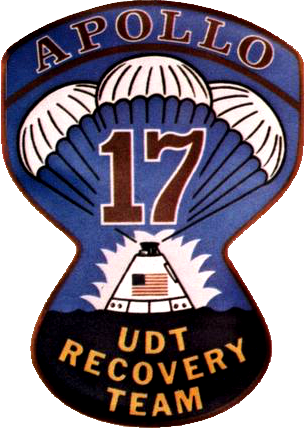
Underwater Demolition Team 11 (UDT-11) for the recovery of the Apollo 17 mission, in December 1972

Initially, the splashdown of U.S. crewed space capsules were unassisted. That changed quickly after the second crewed flight; when Mercury 11 hit the water following reentry, the hatch blew and she sank, nearly drowning Gus Grissom. All Mercury, Gemini, and Apollo space capsules were subsequently met by UDTs 11 or 12 upon splashdown. Before the hatch was opened, the UDTs would attach a flotation collar to the capsule and liferaft for the astronauts to safely exit the craft.

== Vietnam War ==
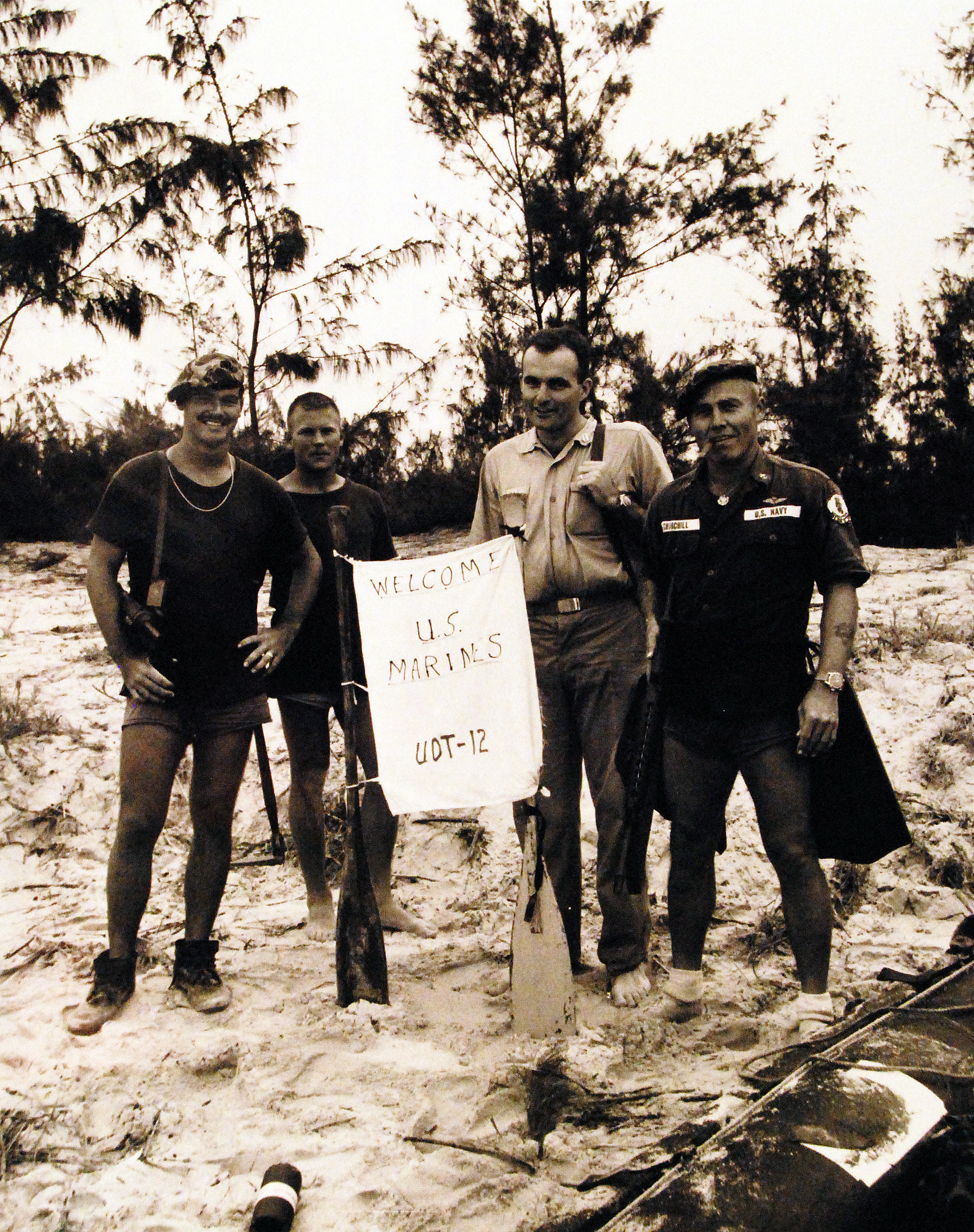
(USN 1109964F) UDT 12 maintaining UDT Seabee tradition 1965 at DaNang in 1965

The Navy entered the Vietnam War in 1958, when the UDTs delivered a small watercraft far up the Mekong River into Laos. In 1961, naval advisers started training South Vietnamese personnel in South Vietnam. The men were called the Liên Đoàn Người Nhái (LDNN) or Vietnamese Frogmen, which translates as "Frogmen Team".

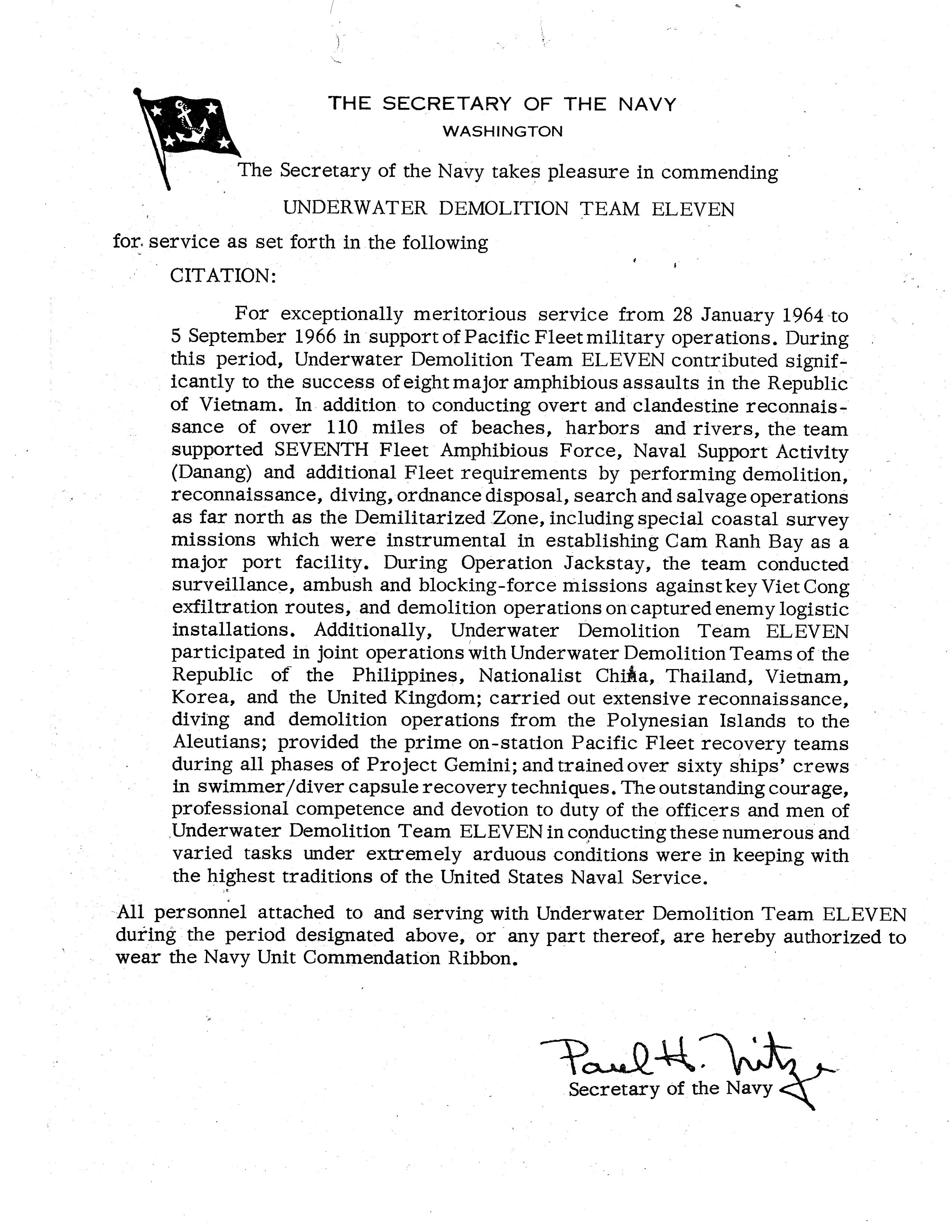
UDT 11 awarded the Navy Unit Commendation in 1966.

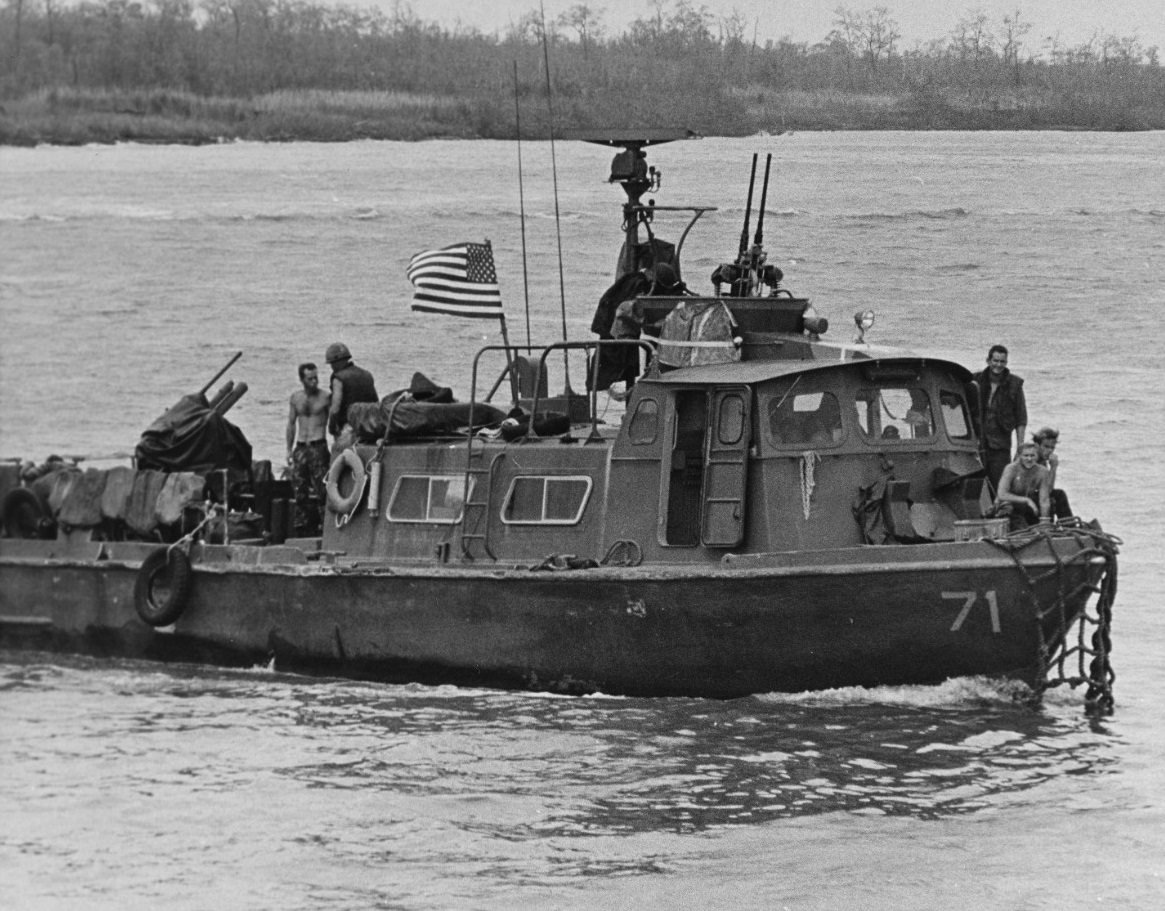
Underwater Demolition Team from Task Force 116 returns to the Sea Float base on the Cua Long River after a patrol.

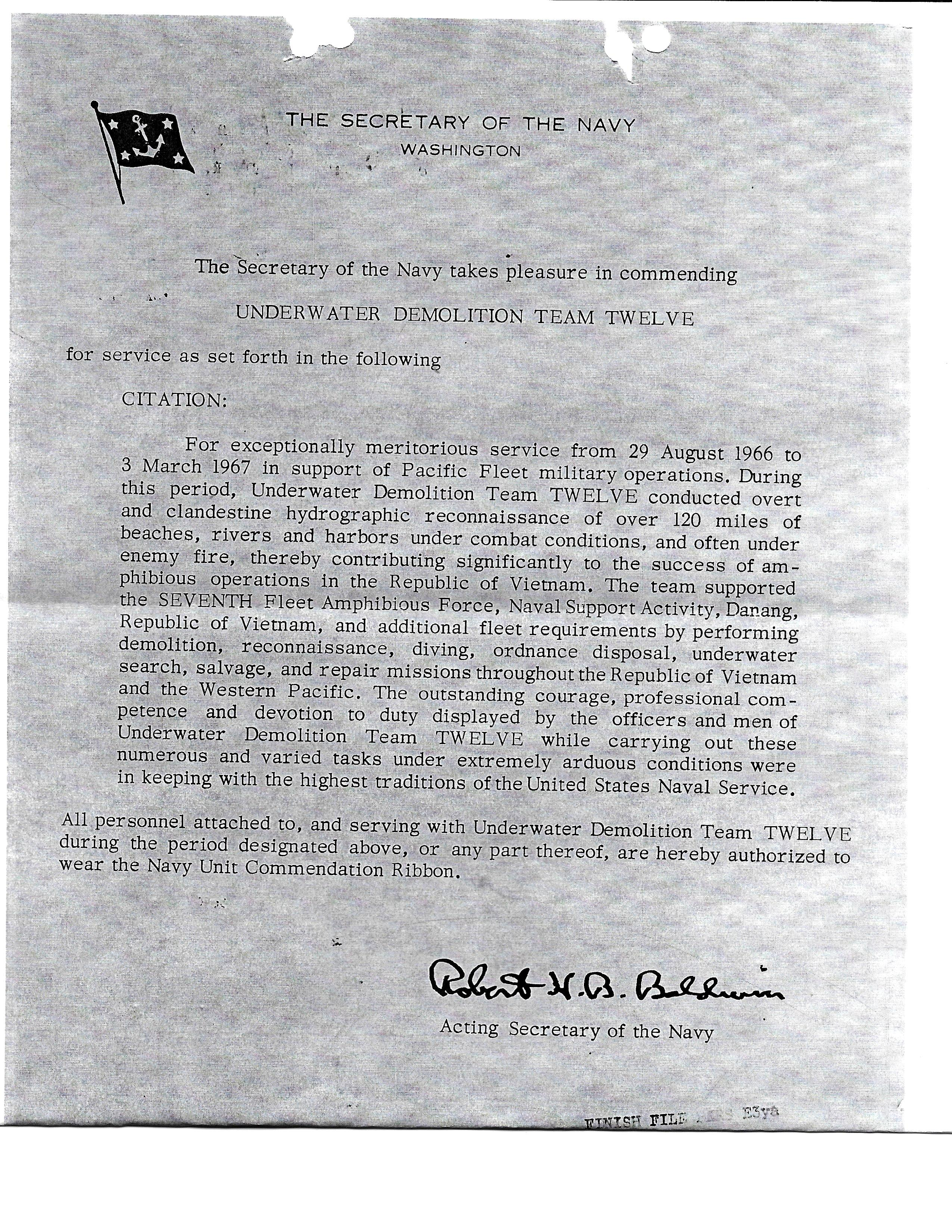
UDT 12 awarded the Navy Unit Commendation for service in Vietnam from August 1966 to March 1967.

UDT teams carried out hydrographic surveys in South Vietnam's coastal waters and reconnaissance missions of harbors, beaches and rivers often under hazardous conditions and enemy fire.

Later, the UDTs supported the Amphibious Ready Groups operating on South Vietnam's rivers. UDTs manned riverine patrol craft and went ashore to demolish obstacles and enemy bunkers. They operated throughout South Vietnam, from the Mekong Delta (Sea Float), the Parrot's Beak and French canal AO's through I Corps and the Song Cui Dai estuary south of Da Nang.

== Birth of Navy SEALs ==
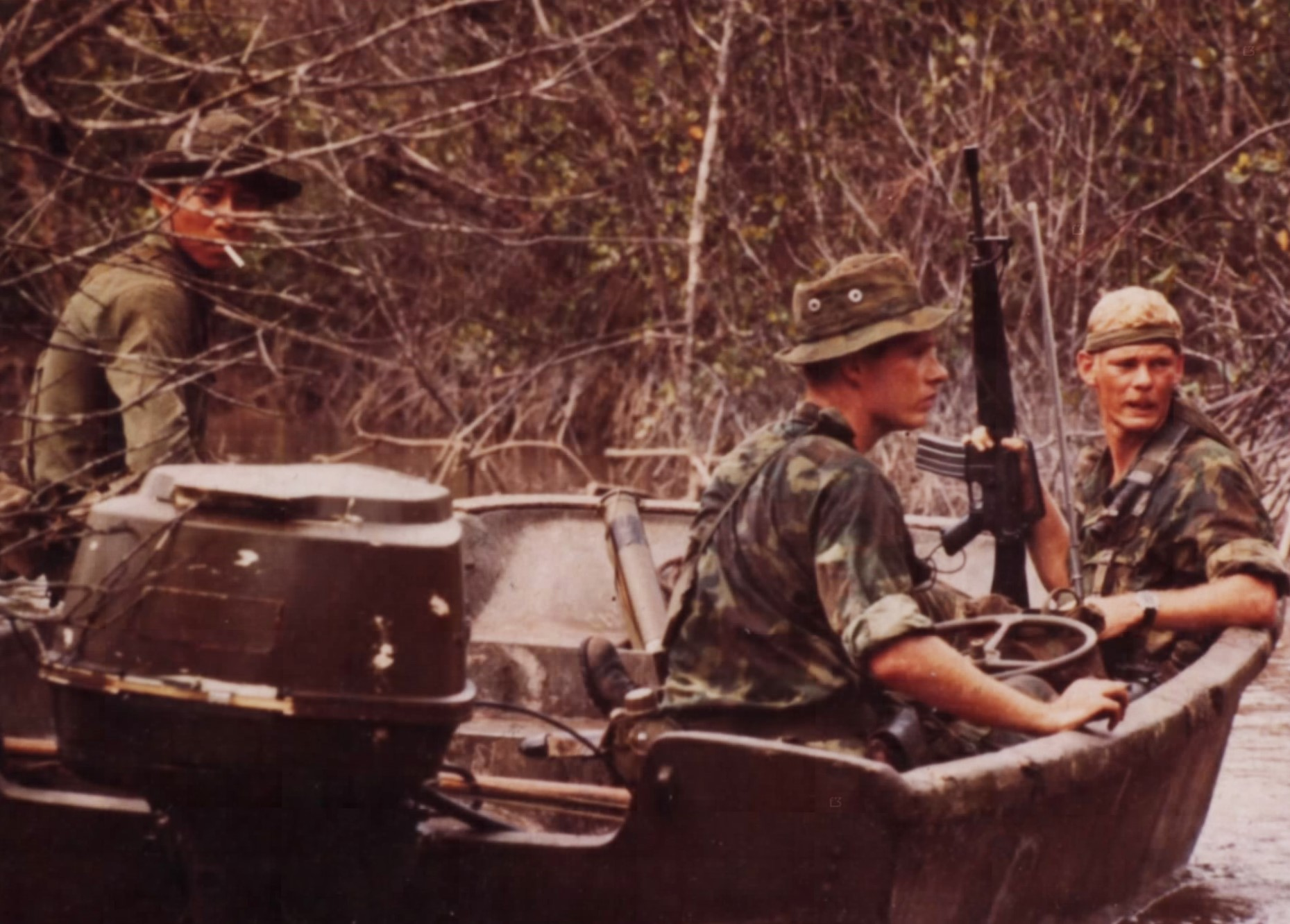
UDT-12 personnel place sensors along VC trail

In the mid-1950s, the Navy saw how the UDT's mission had expanded to a broad range of "unconventional warfare", but also that this clashed with the UDT's traditional focus on maritime operations swimming, boat, and diving operations. It was therefore decided to create a new type of unit that would build on the UDT's elite qualities and water-borne expertise, but would add land combat skills, including parachute training and guerrilla/counterinsurgency operations. These new teams would come to be known as the US Navy SEALs, an acronym for Sea, Air, and Land. Initially there was a lag in the unit's creation until President John F. Kennedy took office. Kennedy recognized the need for unconventional warfare, and supported the use of special operations forces against guerrilla activity. The Navy moved forward to establish its new special operations force and in January 1962 commissioned SEAL Team ONE in NAB Coronado and SEAL Team TWO at NAB Little Creek. In 1964, Boat Support Unit ONE was established, designed to directly support NSW operations, and was initially outfitted primarily by UDTs and newly established SEALs. UDT-11 & 12 were still active on the west coast and UDT-21 & 22 on the east coast. The SEALs quickly earned a reputation for valor and stealth in Vietnam, where they conducted clandestine raids in perilous territory.

=== Reorganization ===
From 1974–1975, UDT 13 was redesignated; some personnel established Underwater Construction Teams, while others joined the special boat detachment. In May 1983, the remaining UDT teams were reorganized as SEAL teams. UDT 11 became SEAL Team Five and UDT 12 became Seal Delivery Vehicle Team One. UDT 21 became SEAL Team Four and UDT 22 became Seal Delivery Vehicle Team Two. A new team, SEAL Team Three was established in October 1983. Since then, teams of SEALs have taken on clandestine missions in war-torn regions around the world, tracking high-profile targets such as Panama's Manuel Noriega and Colombian drug lord Pablo Escobar, and playing integral roles in the wars in Iraq and Afghanistan.

In the December 1987 issue of "All Hands - Magazine of the US Navy", the then longest serving UDT/SEAL Team member, Master Chief Rudy Boesch, was interviewed about his experience throughout the UDT's long-term evolution. His career with The Teams during this era was recorded as follows:

Just before the end of World War II [], his long association with Navy special warfare began, for Boesch had just volunteered to serve with the UDTs, otherwise known as the Scouts and Raiders...Sent to Fort Pierce, Fla., then home of the UDTs, Boesch became part of one of the most illustrious special warfare units to come outof World War II and one that would become the nucleus of the present-day SEALs...These guerrilla units would have supported the planned Allied invasion of Japan had the war not ended in August 1945...With the war over, the Scouts and Raiders were soon disbanded...following the decommissioning of the Scouts and Raiders in 1945, Boesch was assigned duties [in the regular fleet] beforere joining the UDTs and the special warfare community in 1951...Boesch remained a combat swimmer with the UDTs for 11 years until 1962, when the mission of special warfare was expanded and the UDTs took on a new name and role. They became known as “SEALs” because they would operate in the three environments of Sea, Air, and Land and would be called upon to conduct unconventional warfare at sea and in coastal and river areas. The initial muster role was made up of men already in the old UDT organization.

Though reorganized as SEAL Teams, the UDT heritage remains. For example, the National Navy UDT-SEAL Museum opened in 1985. The UDT-SEAL Association, chartered as a Veterans Service Organization in 2013, includes Naval Combat Demolition Units, Amphibious Scouts and Raiders, OSS Maritime Units, Underwater Demolition Teams, SEAL Teams, and SEAL Delivery Vehicle Teams as "Combat Swimmer" units, categorizes them as "The Teams", and offers only such personnel regular association membership.

The long-term administrative transition is also found between the legacy UDT Navy Enlistment Classification (NEC) and the more modern SEAL NEC. For example, the 1993 DoD Occupational Conversion Index continued to classify SEAL NEC 5326 under the UDT/EOD occupation heading. A 1997 Office of the Secretary of Defense study used the umbrella NEC 532X to refer to Special Warfare Combatant Swimmers, incorporating the defunct UDT NEC of 5321 and SEAL NEC 5326. The 2003 Naval Education and Training publication 14504 stated, "The Navy special warfare community includes enlisted personnel qualified for assigned secondary NECs 5321 [and] 5326...Once qualified, personnel maybe assigned...as underwater demolition/sea-air-land (UDT/SEAL) team operators". In 2005, Navy Milpersman 1220-010 removed the reference to NEC 5321 and explicitly used NEC 532X as the Sea-Air-Land Operators (SEAL) designator. This is consistent with the UDT-SEAL Association charter, which defines the 532X classification as a "SEAL operator NEC".

== Badge ==
UDT Badges

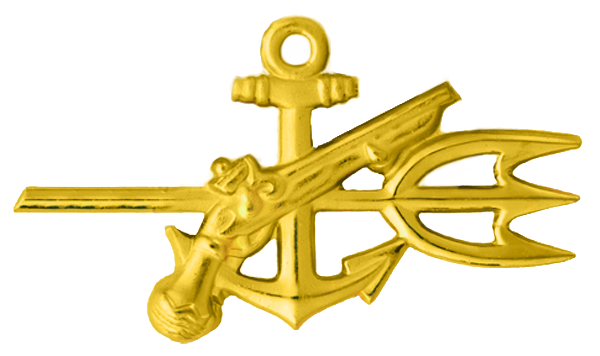
Officer Underwater Demolition Badge

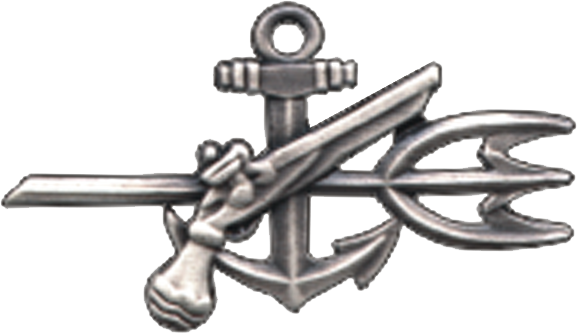
Enlisted Underwater Demolition Badge

In October 1969, the U.S. Navy authorized the Underwater Demolition insignia for those who had served in an UDT. However, this UDT badge was phased out in 1971, as was the silver badge for enlisted SEAL and Underwater Demolition Team members. After that, SEAL and UDT operators, both officer and enlisted, were all awarded the same gold Navy Special Warfare Insignia (known as the "SEAL Trident"), as well as gold Navy jump wings. UDT members who had received the legacy insignia were authorized to apply for the superseding Navy Special Warfare device.

Although the UDT insignia was short-lived and superseded by the SEAL Trident, its symbolism endured. In 2006, the Navy would create the Special Warfare Operator (SO) rating with a specialty mark identical to the defunct UDT badge. This heraldry directly ties the historic Underwater Demolition Team legacy to modern day Navy SEALs.

== Unit awards ==
The UDTs have received several unit citations and commendations. Members who participated in actions that merited the award are authorized to wear the medal or ribbon associated with the award on their uniform. Awards and decorations of the United States Armed Forces have different categories, (i.e. Service, Campaign, Unit, and Personal). Unit Citations are distinct from the other decorations.

Naval Combat Demolition Force O (Omaha beach) Normandy

- Presidential Unit Citation Normandy

Naval Combat Demolition Force U (Utah beach): Normandy

- Navy Unit Commendation: Normandy

UDT 1

- Navy Unit Commendation: Korea

UDT 4

- Navy Unit Commendation: Guam
- Navy Unit Commendation: Leyte
- Navy Unit Commendation: Okinawa

UDT 7

- Navy Unit Commendation: Marianas
- Navy Unit Commendation: Western Carolinas
- Navy Unit Commendation: Okinawa

UDT 11

- Presidential Unit Citation: Okinawa
- Presidential Unit Citation: Bruni Bay, Borneo
- Presidential Unit Citation: Balikpapan, Burneo
- Navy Unit Commendation 1966
- Navy Meritorious Unit Commendation 1968
- Navy Unit Commendation 1969
- Presidential Unit Citation 1969
- Navy Meritorious Unit Commendation 1969
- Navy Meritorious Unit Commendation 1969
- Navy Meritorious Unit Commendation 1970
- Republic of Vietnam Civil Actions Medal Unit Citation
- Republic of Vietnam Gallantry Cross with Palm Unit Award
- Coast Guard Meritorious Unit Commendation

UDT 12

- Presidential Unit Citation: Iwo Jima
- Presidential Unit Citation: Okinawa
- Navy Unit Commendation 1966
- Navy Meritorious Unit Commendation: Vietnam 1967
- Navy Meritorious Unit Commendation: Vietnam 1967
- Navy Meritorious Unit Commendation: Vietnam 1968
- Navy Meritorious Unit Commendation: Vietnam 1968
- Navy Meritorious Unit Commendation: Vietnam 1969
- Republic of Vietnam Gallantry Cross with Palm Unit Award
- Operation Eagle Pull
- Operation Frequent Wind
- Humanitarian Service Medal 1979 Boat People

UDT 13

- Navy Meritorious Unit Commendation: Vietnam 1969
- Republic of Vietnam Gallantry Cross with Palm Unit Award 1970

UDT 14

- Navy Unit Commendation: Luzon
- Navy Unit Commendation: Iwo Jima
- Navy Unit Commendation: Okinawa

UDT 21

- Navy Expeditionary Medal
- Navy Meritorious Unit Commendation: Vietnam
- Navy Meritorious Unit Commendation: Vietnam
- Navy Meritorious Unit Commendation: Vietnam
- Navy Meritorious Unit Commendation: Vietnam

UDT 22

- Navy Meritorious Unit Commendation: Vietnam 1969
- OPNAV NOTICE 1650, MASTER LIST OF UNIT AWARDS AND CAMPAIGN MEDALS

== Fiction ==
- The Frogmen (1951), starring Dana Andrews and Richard Widmark. World War II film based on the Underwater Demolition Teams. Contemporary UDT members appear in several sequences.
- Underwater Warrior (1958) directed by Andrew Marton is based on the memoirs of Lieutenant-Commander Francis Douglas Fane, Naked Warriors.

== See also ==
- United States Naval Special Warfare Command – Naval component of United States Special Operations Command
- List of former United States special operations units
- Underwater demolition – Deliberate destruction of underwater obstacles
- Seabee – Member of the US Naval Construction Forces
- Underwater Construction Teams – Navy construction battalion underwater construction units
- United States Navy SEALs – U.S. Navy's special operations force
- United States special operations forces
- Republic of Korea Navy Special Warfare Flotilla – Special warfare unit of Republic of Korea Navy
