= Rufus G. Herring =

U.S. Navy Reserve officer (1921–1996)

Rufus Geddie Herring
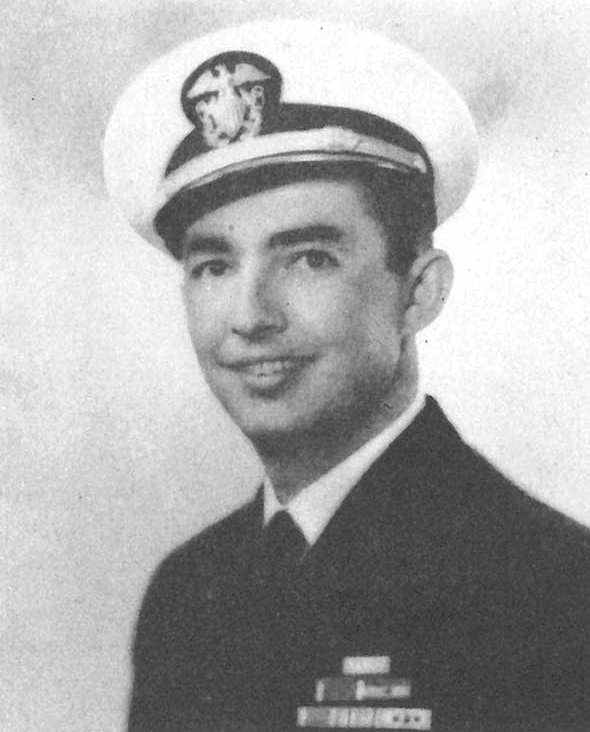
- Born: June 11, 1921; Roseboro, North Carolina, U.S.
- Died: January 31, 1996 (aged 74); Roseboro, North Carolina, U.S.
- Burial place: Roseboro Cemetery, Roseboro, North Carolina
- Military career
- Allegiance: United States of America
- Branch: United States Naval Reserve
- Service years: 1942–1947
- Rank: Lieutenant commander
- Commands: USS LCI(L)-449 / LCI(G)-449
- Conflicts: World War II; Battle of Kwajalein; Battle of Saipan; Battle of Tinian; Battle of Guam; Battle of Iwo Jima
- Awards: Medal of Honor

Rufus Geddie Herring (June 11, 1921 – January 31, 1996) was a United States Naval Reserve officer and a recipient of America's highest military decoration—the Medal of Honor—for his actions in World War II.

== Biography ==
Rufus Herring attended Davidson College, Davidson, North Carolina where he was initiated into Pi Kappa Phi fraternity on February 3, 1939. After graduating in the spring of 1942, Rufus Herring enlisted in the U.S. Naval Reserve and subsequently attended the Naval Reserve Midshipman School in New York City. After being commissioned in the rank of ensign in December 1942, he received diesel engine instruction at the University of Illinois, followed by orders to the Amphibious Training Base at Solomons, Maryland. In August 1943 he assumed command of the newly completed infantry landing craft USS LCI(L)-449 and remained her commanding officer during the next year and a half. Herring was promoted to lieutenant, junior grade, in March 1944 and between February and July of that year he participated in the invasions of Kwajalein, Saipan, Tinian and Guam.

In February 1945 Herring's ship, by then designated a gunboat landing craft (LCI(G)-449), took part in the pre-invasion bombardment of Iwo Jima. On February 17, while shelling enemy positions in support of Underwater Demolition Team swimmers, the ship was heavily hit by Japanese counterfire and went out of control. Despite very serious wounds that left him gravely weakened, Herring took the helm, rallied his men, and kept the ship in action. For his "conspicuous gallantry and intrepidity at the risk of his life above and beyond the call of duty," he was awarded the Medal of Honor.

Sent back to the United States for hospitalization, Herring was promoted to lieutenant in August 1945. In April 1947, he was transferred to the retired list with the rank of lieutenant commander. Rufus G. Herring subsequently returned to his hometown of Roseboro, North Carolina, where he pursued a business career. He died on January 31, 1996, and is buried in Roseboro Cemetery.

== Medal of Honor citation ==
Lieutenant, Junior Grade, Rufus Herring's official Medal of Honor citation reads:

For conspicuous gallantry and intrepidity at the risk of his life above and beyond the call of duty as Commanding Officer of LCI (G) 449 operating as a unit of LCI (G) Group EIGHT, during the preinvasion attack on Iwo Jima on 17 February 1945. Boldly closing the strongly fortified shores under the devastating fire of Japanese coastal defense guns, Lieutenant (then Lieutenant, Junior Grade,) Herring directed shattering barrages of 40-mm. and 20-mm. gunfire against hostile beaches until struck down by the enemy's savage counterfire which blasted the 449's heavy guns and whipped her decks into sheets of flame. Regaining consciousness despite profuse bleeding he was again critically wounded when a Japanese mortar crashed the conning station, instantly killing or fatally wounding most of the officers and leaving the ship wallowing without navigational control. Upon recovering the second time, Lieutenant Herring resolutely climbed down to the pilot house and, fighting against his rapidly waning strength, took over the helm, established communication with the engine room and carried on valiantly until relief could be obtained. When no longer able to stand, he propped himself against empty shell cases and rallied his men to the aid of the wounded; he maintained position in the firing line with his 20-mm guns in action in the face of sustained enemy fire and conned his crippled ship to safety. His unwavering fortitude, aggressive perseverance and indomitable spirit against terrific odds reflect the highest credit upon Lieutenant Herring and uphold the highest traditions of the United States Naval Service.

== Awards and decorations ==

1st row	Medal of Honor		Purple Heart
2nd row	Combat Action Ribbon	Presidential Unit Citation with one service star	Navy Unit Commendation
3rd row	American Campaign Medal	Asiatic-Pacific Campaign Medal with three campaign stars	World War II Victory Medal

== See also ==
- List of Medal of Honor recipients
- List of Medal of Honor recipients for the Battle of Iwo Jima
