= Howell–Butler House =

Historic house in North Carolina, United States

- U.S. National Register of Historic Places
- Location within North Carolina Location within the United States
- Location: Broad and McLamb Sts., Roseboro, North Carolina
- Coordinates: 34°57′2″N 78°30′49″W
- Area: less than one acre
- Built: c. 1900
- MPS: Sampson County MRA
- NRHP reference No.: 86000560
- Added to NRHP: March 17, 1986

The Howell–Butler House is a historic home located at Roseboro, Sampson County, North Carolina. The house was built about 1900, and consists of a front two-story, three-bay-by-two-bay frame block, a wide rear ell and a two-room side wing. It has a hipped roof, is sheathed in German siding, and features two massive, interior paneled brick chimneys and a wraparound porch. It has a center hall, double-pile interior. Also on the property is the contributing frame storage house.

It was added to the National Register of Historic Places in 1986.
